This is a list of dynasties and dynastic regimes in the context of monarchy organized by geographic region. Extant dynasties are rendered in bold and highlighted.

General information

Criteria for inclusion
This list includes defunct and extant monarchical dynasties of sovereign, non-sovereign, national, and subnational statuses. Monarchical polities each ruled by a single family—that is, a dynasty, although not explicitly styled as such, like the Golden Horde and the Qara Qoyunlu—are included.

While most dynasties were/are reckoned through the male line, the relatively uncommon cases of dynasties formed through matrilineal succession, such as the Rain Queen dynasty, are also listed.

Although thrones would theoretically be rotated among several families in elective monarchies, some entities consistently elected/elect their rulers from the same family, effectively functioning as hereditary monarchies controlled by dynasties. For example, the Holy Roman Empire was de jure an elective monarchy, but came under the de facto hereditary rule of the House of Habsburg from AD 1440 to AD 1740, and is therefore listed as such in the "Germany" section.

This list also includes monarchical regimes whose ruling houses became extinct or were removed from power after having only one monarch, but would otherwise have been dynastic in their throne successions. For instance, whereas the Thonburi Kingdom had only one ruler, it would likely have produced a series of monarchs from the same ruling clan had the throne not been usurped by the Chakri dynasty; the Thonburi Kingdom is thus included under the "Thailand (Siam)" section.

Where possible, descendants of overthrown dynasties and pretenders are also listed. For instance, the House of Plantagenet laid claim to the throne of the Kingdom of Sicily between AD 1254 and AD 1263, and is thus listed under the "Italy" section. Likewise, the Osmanoğlu family is descended from the Ottoman dynasty, and is therefore included in the "Anatolia (Asia Minor)" section.

Entries in each section are sorted by the start year and end year of their rule, irrespective of the exact dates. Dynasties with unverifiable or disputed periods of rule are listed after those with reign periods that are generally agreed upon by scholars. In cases wherein several dynasties are typically grouped together in conventional historiography, such as the Northern and Southern dynasties of China, they are listed as such for ease of reference.

Houses of nobility that had/have no territorial holdings (and thus were/are not monarchical dynasties in their own right), like the House of Sayn-Wittgenstein-Ludwigsburg and the House of Jocelyn; dynasties of micronations, like the Bertoleoni dynasty; dynasties of religious sects, like the Nusaybah family and the Slonim dynasty; political families, like the Roosevelt family and the Chiang family; family dictatorships, like the Mount Paektu bloodline and the Duvalier dynasty; and dynastic military regimes, like the Choe clan and the Ashikaga shogunate, are not included.

Nomenclature
A dynasty may be known by more than one name, either due to differences between its official and historiographical denominations, and/or due to the existence of multiple official and/or historiographical names. For example, the Amorian dynasty is also referred to as the "Phrygian dynasty".

Due to variations in romanization, the name of a dynasty may be rendered differently depending on the source. For instance, the Qing dynasty is also written as "Ch῾ing dynasty" using the Wade–Giles romanization.

In layman and academic parlance, the name of a dynasty is often affixed before the common name of a state in reference to a state under the rule of a particular dynasty. For example, whereas the official name of the realm ruled by the Qajar dynasty was the "Sublime State of Iran", the domain is commonly known as "Qajar Iran".

Period of rule
The year of establishment and/or the year of collapse of a dynasty may be unknown or remain contentious among scholars. In the latter cases, only an approximate time frame will be given. For example, the Deva dynasty is believed to have ruled during the 12th and 13th centuries AD, but the exact dates are disputed.

The year of establishment and/or the year of collapse of a dynasty could differ from its period of rule over a particular realm and/or geographic region. In such cases, the year(s) provided indicate the period during which a dynasty was/is in power in a particular realm and/or geographic region. For instance, whereas the House of Savoy was founded in AD 1003 in the County of Savoy and maintained its rule until AD 1946 in the Kingdom of Italy, it briefly held the throne of Spain from AD 1870 to AD 1873, and is thus reflected as such in the "Spain" section.

Location of rule
This list is sorted by the territorial extent of dynasties. Listing a particular dynasty under a specific section need not necessarily denote affiliation—political, ethnic, religious, cultural, or otherwise—between the historical dynasty and the contemporary polity/polities existing in the same region. As the succession of states and the identities of the rulers, elites, and subjects or citizens are complex and contentious issues, the classification of dynasties may be multidimensional. For example, the Ayyubid dynasty has been variously described as "Egyptian" and "Syrian" based on its geographic location and the titles held by its monarchs; "Kurdish" according to its rulers' ethnicity; "Arabized" according to its cultural identity; and "Muslim", "Islamic", and "Sunni" based on its religious faith.

Some dynasties appear more than once in this list, because:
 more than one realm was/is ruled by a single dynasty; or
 a single dynastic realm spanned/spans across more than one geographic region.

For example, apart from previously ruling over the possessions of the British Empire and numerous sovereign states that later abolished the monarchy, the House of Windsor remains the ruling dynasty of 15 sovereign states and their associated territories, and is therefore included in multiple sections. Likewise, although the Tang dynasty existed as a single realm, it had at various points in time ruled over China proper, Dzungaria, the Tarim Basin, the Mongolian Plateau, Inner Manchuria, Outer Manchuria, as well as parts of Central Asia, the Korean Peninsula, Vietnam, Siberia, and Afghanistan, and is thus listed under multiple sections.

Regions with long lines of "local" dynasties—including dynasties of indigenous and non-indigenous (but had/have assumed "local" characteristics) provenances—that experienced partial or full colonization in the modern era are given separate lists for clarity. For instance, the "Indian Subcontinent (South Asia)" section includes a main list containing "local" South Asian dynasties, such as the indigenous Chola dynasty and the non-indigenous Mughal dynasty, and a subsection listing the decidedly "foreign" dynasties of colonial entities, like the House of Bourbon of French India.

Extant dynasties

List of extant dynasties ruling sovereign monarchies

At present, there are 44 sovereign realms—including 43 sovereign states (and their associated territories) and one sovereign entity in international law without territorial possession—ruled by monarchs, of which 41 are under dynastic control. There are currently 26 sovereign dynasties, two of which rule more than one sovereign realm.

List of sovereign states and territories with extant non-sovereign dynasties

The following is a list of sovereign states and territories with existing dynasties ruling non-sovereign polities. Such dynasties usually possess and exercise authority over subnational divisions or people groups.

Non-sovereign dynasties may be conferred official status through constitutional arrangement or government recognition, like the dynasties ruling the Republic of Botswana's subnational chiefdoms. Alternatively, non-sovereign dynasties may exist without official recognition, as in the case of the Te Wherowhero dynasty of the Māori King Movement in New Zealand.

Non-sovereign dynasties could have once held sovereign power (and vice versa). For example, as the Emirate of Umm Al Quwain was formerly an independent shiekdom but is now a constituent emirate of the United Arab Emirates, the currently non-sovereign House of Mualla therefore held sovereign power historically.

Dynasties could simultaneously reign in both sovereign and non-sovereign polities, as is the case of the Bendahara dynasty whose reigning ruler is both the sovereign monarch of Malaysia and the non-sovereign monarch of the Malaysian state of Pahang Darul Makmur.

List of dynasties in Africa

Algeria
 Gaetuli
 Garamantes
 Mauri
 Musulamii
 Quinquegentiani
 Houara
 Masaesyli
 Massylii
 Numidia
 Bavares
 Vandal Kingdom
 Mauro-Roman Kingdom
 Kingdom of the Aurès
 Kingdom of Altava
 Kingdom of Capsus
 Kingdom of Ouarsenis
 Jarawa (Berber tribe)
 Banu Ifran
 Ifranid dynasty
 Muhallabids (771–793)
 Rustamid dynasty (777–909)
 Sanhaja
 Aghlabid dynasty (800–909)
 Fatimid dynasty – 
 Kutama
 Maghrawa
 Miknasa
 Sulaymanid dynasty (814–922)
 Zirid dynasty (972–1148)
 Awlad Mandil
 Banu Khazrun (1001–1146)
 Hammadid dynasty (1014–1152)
 Banu Hilal
 Banu Kinanah
 Banu Ghaniya
 Zenata
 Hafsid dynasty (1229–1574)
 Zayyanid dynasty (1236–1337, 1348–1352, 1359–1550) – 
 Ottoman dynasty (1515–1830) – 
 Kingdom of Kuku
 Kingdom of Ait Abbas
 Banu Djellab – 
 Emirate of Abdelkader

Benin
 Aladaxonou dynasty (1600–1900) –

Cabo Verde (Cape Verde)
 House of Aviz (AD 1462–1580) – 
 House of Aviz-Beja (AD 1495–1580) – 
 House of Braganza (AD 1640–1910) – 
 House of Braganza-Saxe-Coburg and Gotha (AD 1853–1910) – 
 Philippine dynasty (AD 1581–1640) –

Central African Republic
 al-'Abbasi dynasty (AD 1501–1912) – 
 House of Bokassa (c. AD 1976–1979) –

Chad
 Duguwa dynasty (c. AD 700–1086) – 
 Sayfawa dynasty (c. AD 1086–1846) – 
 Kenga dynasty (AD 1522–1897) – 
 al-'Abbasi dynasty (AD 1501–1912) –

Congo
 House of Kilukeni (AD 1390–1567) – 
 Kingdom of Loango (AD 1550–1883)
 Kwilu dynasty (AD 1568–1622, AD 1626–1636) – 
 Kingdom of Luba (AD 1585–1889)
 House of Nsundi (AD 1622–1626) – 
 Kingdom of Lunda (AD 1665–1887)
 House of Kinlaza (AD 1665–1666, AD 1669–1716, AD 1743–1752, AD 1764–1787, AD 1842–1857, AD 1859–1891) – 
 House of Kimpanzu (AD 1665, AD 1666–1669, AD 1669–1670, AD 1673–1715, AD 1718–1743, AD 1752–1758, AD 1763–1764, AD 1857–1859, AD 1891–1896) – 
 House of Água Rosada (AD 1688–1718, AD 1803–1842) – 
 Anziku Kingdom (AD 17th century–19th century)
 House of Saxe-Coburg and Gotha (AD 1885–1920) – 
 House of Belgium (AD 1920–1960) –

Egypt

 Dynasty I of Egypt (c. 3100–2900 BC)
 Dynasty II of Egypt (2890–2686 BC)
 Dynasty III of Egypt (2686–2613 BC) – 
 Dynasty IV of Egypt (2613–2498 BC) – 
 Dynasty V of Egypt (2498–2345 BC) – 
 Dynasty VI of Egypt (2345–2181 BC) – 
 Dynasty VII of Egypt (c. 2181 BC) – 
 Dynasty VIII of Egypt (2181–2160 BC)
 Dynasty IX of Egypt (2160–2130 BC)
 Dynasty X of Egypt (2130–2040 BC)
 Dynasty XI of Egypt (2130–1991 BC) – 
 Dynasty XII of Egypt (1991–1802 BC) – 
 Dynasty XIII of Egypt (1803–1649 BC)
 Dynasty XIV of Egypt (1725–1650 BC) – 
 Abydos dynasty (1650–1600 BC) – 
 Dynasty XV of Egypt (1650–1550 BC) – 
 Dynasty XVI of Egypt (1649–1582 BC)
 Dynasty XVII of Egypt (1580–1550 BC)
 Dynasty XVIII of Egypt (1550–1292 BC) – 
 Dynasty XIX of Egypt (1292–1189 BC) – 
 Dynasty XX of Egypt (1189–1077 BC) – 
 Dynasty XXI of Egypt (1069–945 BC)
 Dynasty XXII of Egypt (945–720 BC) – 
 Dynasty XXIII of Egypt (837–728 BC) – 
 Dynasty XXIV of Egypt (732–720 BC)
 Dynasty XXV of Egypt (744–656 BC) – 
 Dynasty XXVI of Egypt (664–525 BC)
 Dynasty XXVII of Egypt (525–404 BC) – 
 Dynasty XXVIII of Egypt (404–398 BC)
 Dynasty XXIX of Egypt (398–380 BC)
 Dynasty XXX of Egypt (380–343 BC)
 Dynasty XXXI of Egypt (343–332 BC) – 
 Argead dynasty (332–309 BC) – 
 Ptolemaic dynasty (305–30 BC) – 
 Julio-Claudian dynasty (27 BC–AD 68) – 
 Flavian dynasty (AD 69–96) – 
 Nervan-Antonian dynasty (AD 96–192) – 
 Severan dynasty (AD 193–235) – 
 Gordian dynasty (AD 238–244) – 
 Decian dynasty (AD 249–253) – 
 Valerian dynasty (AD 253–268) – 
 Illyrian emperors (AD 268–270, AD 273–284) – 
 House of Odaenathus (AD 270–273) – 
 Caran dynasty (AD 282–285) – 
 Constantinian dynasty (AD 303–336) – 
 Valentinianic dynasty (AD 364–378) – 
 Theodosian dynasty (AD 379–457) – 
 Leonid dynasty (AD 457–518) – 
 Justinian dynasty (AD 518–602) – 
 Heraclian dynasty (AD 602–619, AD 628–641) – 
 Sasanian dynasty (AD 619–628) – 
 Umayyad dynasty (AD 661–750) – 
 Abbasid dynasty (AD 750–935) – 
 Tulunid dynasty (AD 868–905) – 
 Ikhshidid dynasty (AD 935–969) – 
 Fatimid dynasty (AD 969–1171) – 
 Banu Kanz (AD 1004–1412) – 
 Awlad Mandil (AD 1160–1372)
 Ayyubid dynasty (AD 1171–1250) – 
 Bahri dynasty (AD 1250–1382) – 
 Burji dynasty (AD 1382–1517) – 
 Ottoman dynasty (AD 1517–1798, AD 1801–1867) – 
 Muhammad Ali dynasty (AD 1805–1953) –

Eswatini (Swaziland)

  (1745–present)
 House of Saxe-Coburg and Gotha (1906–1917) – 
 House of Windsor (1917–1968) –

Ethiopia

 Dʿmt (980–400 BC)
 Solomonic dynasty (ሰለሞናዊው ሥርወ መንግሥት) (AD 100–940, AD 1270–1974) – 
 Gondarine line (AD 1606–1769)
 Tewodros dynasty (AD 1855–1868)
 Tigrayan line (AD 1871–1889)
 Shewan line (AD 1889–1936, AD 1941–1975)
 Makhzumi dynasty (AD 896–1286)
 Zagwe dynasty (c. AD 900–1270, AD 1868–1871) – 
 Walashma dynasty (AD 1285–1577)
 Kingdom of Garo (AD 1567–1883)
 Gideons dynasty (?–AD 1627) – 
 Mudaito dynasty (AD 1734–1971)
 House of Savoy (AD 1936–1947) – 
 Gideonite dynasty (?–?) –

Ghana
  (1670–present) –

Guinea
 Keita dynasty (c. 1200–1670)
 Wassoulou Empire (1878–1898)

Lesotho

  (1822–present)

Libya
 Gaetuli
 Garamantes
 Psylli
 Libu
 Meshwesh
 Zenata
 Houara
 Twenty-second Dynasty of Egypt
 Twenty-third Dynasty of Egypt
 Nasamones
 Laguatan
 Jarawa (Berber tribe)
 Muhallabids (771–793)
 Rustamid dynasty (777–909)
 Aghlabid dynasty (800–909)
 Banu Khazrun (1001–1046)
 Banu Ghaniya (1126–1203)
 Awlad Mandil (1160–1372)
 Hafsid dynasty (1229–1574)
 Banu Hilal
 Banu Sulaym
 Banu Kinana
 Banu Thabet
 Bani-Nasr dynasty
 Theocratic kingdoms of Kharijite sectarians
 Awlad Suleiman dynasty in Murzuq
 Karamanli dynasty (1711–1835)
 House of Senussi (1951–1969) –

Madagascar

 Hova dynasty (1540–1897) –

Mali
 Keita dynasty (11th century–17th century) – 
 Za dynasty
 Sonni dynasty (14th century–1493) – 
 Askiya dynasty (1493–1591) – 
 Coulibaly dynasty (1712–1862) – 
 Toucouleur Empire (1848–1893)

Mauritius
 House of Bourbon-Vendôme (AD 1715–1792) – 
 House of Bonaparte (AD 1804–1810) – 
 House of Hanover (AD 1810–1901) – 
 House of Saxe-Coburg and Gotha (AD 1901–1917) – 
 House of Windsor (AD 1917–1992) –

Morocco (+ Mauritania)

 Gaetuli
 Garamantes
 Mauri
 Houara
 Mauretania
 Jarawa (Berber tribe)
 Emirate of Sijilmasa
 Kingdom of Nekor (710–1019)
 Barghawata (744–1058)
 Midrarid dynasty (757–976)
 Idrisid dynasty (789–974)
 Banu Isam
 Reguibat tribe
 Tajakant
 Miknasa
 Godala
 Masmuda
 Ghomaras
 Sanhaja
 Lamtuna
 Hammudid dynasty
 Taifa of Ceuta
 Almoravid dynasty (1060–1147)
 Maqil
 Beni Ḥassān
 Banu Kinanah
 Tinmel
 Almohad dynasty (1147–1258)
 Awlad Mandil
 Zenata
 Marinid dynasty (1258–1465)
 Wattasid dynasty (1472–1554)
 Kunta (tribe)
 Bled es-Siba
 Ouartajin dynasty (1430–1563) – 
 Ait Yafelman
 Aït Atta
 Ait Saghrouchen
 Tekna
 Zaouia of Dila
 Saadi dynasty (1554–1659)
 Kingdom of Fez
 Kingdom of Sus
 Kingdom of Marrakesh
 Hintata
 Kingdom of Tafilalt
  (1666–present)

Niger
 Sonni dynasty (14th century–1493) – 
 Askiya dynasty (1493–1901) –

Nigeria

 Eri dynasty of the Igbo and Igala peoples
 Hausa Kingdoms
 Banza Bakwai
 Hausa Bakwai
 Ibn Fodio dynasty of Sokoto and Gwandu
 Jaja dynasty of Opobu
 Modibo Adama dynasty of Adamawa
 el-Kanemi dynasty of Bornu
 Ooduan dynasty of Ife, Egba, Ketu, Sabe, Oyo, Ijero and the Ilas
 Omoremilekun Asodeboyede dynasty of Akure (a cadet branch of the Ooduan dynasty)
 Ado dynasty of Lagos (a cadet branch of the Ooduan dynasty)
 Eweka dynasty of Benin (a cadet branch of the Ooduan dynasty)
 Sayfawa dynasty of Bornu
  (1498–present) – 
 Sokoto Caliphate (1804–1903)

São Tomé and Príncipe
 House of Aviz (AD 1470–1580) – 
 House of Aviz-Beja (AD 1495–1580) – 
 House of Braganza (AD 1640–1910) – 
 House of Braganza-Saxe-Coburg and Gotha (AD 1853–1910) – 
 Philippine dynasty (AD 1581–1640) –

Senegambia
 Lamanic period
 Joof family
 House of Boureh Gnilane Joof
 House of Jogo Siga Joof
 House of Semou Njekeh Joof
 Guelowar dynasty (1350–1969)
 Joos dynasty (1367–1855)
 Denianke dynasty (1512–1776) –

Seychelles
 House of Bourbon-Vendôme (AD 1756–1792) – 
 House of Bonaparte (AD 1804–1810) – 
 House of Hanover (AD 1810–1901) – 
 House of Saxe-Coburg and Gotha (AD 1901–1917) – 
 House of Windsor (AD 1917–1976) –

Somalia
 Macrobia Kingdom – 
 House of Garen (AD 9th century–17th century) – 
 Gobroon dynasty (AD 17th century–1910) – 
 Majeerteen Sultanate (Saldanadii Majeerteen) (c. AD 1800–1924)
 Sultanate of Hobyo (Saldanadii Hobyo) (AD 1878–1925)
 House of Savoy (AD 1889–1946) –

Somaliland 

 Macrobia Kingdom – 
 Adal Sultanate (AD 9th century–13th century)
 Walashma dynasty (Boqortooyadii Walashma) (AD 1285–1577) – 
 Guled dynasty (AD 1750–1884) – 
 Habr Yunis Sultanate (Saldanadii Habar Yoonis) (c. AD late 18th century-1884)
 House of Hanover (AD 1884–1901) – 
 House of Saxe-Coburg and Gotha (AD 1901–1917) – 
 House of Windsor (AD 1917–1940, AD 1941–1960) –

South Africa
  – 
  – 
  – 
  – 
  – 
  –

Sudan
 Daju dynasty (12th century–15th century) – 
 Tunjur dynasty (15th century–1650) – 
 Keira dynasty (1603–1874) – 
 Muhammad Ali dynasty (1821–1885) – 
 House of al-Mahdi (1845–1945)

Tunisia
 Gaetuli
 Garamantes
 Musulamii
 Zenata
 Houara
 Ancient Carthage
 Massylii
 Kingdom of Capsus
 Vandal Kingdom
 Jarawa (Berber tribe)
 Sanhaja
 Aghlabid dynasty
 Fatimid dynasty
 Muhallabids (771–793)
 Zirid dynasty (972–1148)
 Awlad Mandil
 Banu Hilal
 Banu Ghaniya
 Banu Kinanah
 Khurasanid dynasty (1059–1158)
 Kingdom of Africa
 Hafsid dynasty (1229–1574)
 Hintata
 Husainid dynasty

Uganda
  (?–present) –

Western Sahara
 House of Bourbon-Anjou (AD 1884–1931, AD 1975–1976) – 
  (AD 1976–present) –

Zimbabwe
 House of Changamire (1660–1889) –

List of dynasties in Asia

Afghanistan
 Median dynasty (678–550 BC)
 Achaemenid dynasty (550–330 BC) – 
 Seleucid dynasty (330–150 BC)
 Maurya Empire (305–180 BC)
 House of Diodotus (255–223 BC) – 
 Arsacid dynasty (247 BC–AD 224)
 Euthydemid dynasty (230 BC–AD 10) – 
 House of Eucratides (170–130 BC) – 
 House of Suren (12 BC–AD 130) – 
 Kushan Empire (AD 30–375)
 Sasanian dynasty (AD 230–651) – 
 Kidarites (AD 320–465)
 Alchon Huns (AD 370–670)
 Hephthalite Empire (AD 440–710)
 Nezak Huns (AD 484–665)
 Tokhara Yabghus (AD 625–758)
 Tang dynasty (AD 657–670) – 
 Umayyad dynasty (AD 661–750) – 
 Kabul Shahi (AD 665–1026)
 Turk Shahis (AD 665–850)
 Hindu Shahis (AD 850–1026)
 Zunbils (AD 680–870)
 Abbasid dynasty (AD 750–821) – 
 Lawik dynasty (AD 750–977)
 Tahirid dynasty (AD 821–873)
 Saffarid dynasty (AD 863–900)
 Samanid Empire (AD 875–999)
 Ghurid dynasty (AD 879–1215)
 Farighunids (AD 9th century–1010)
 Ghaznavid dynasty (AD 977–1186)
 Seljuq dynasty (AD 1037–1194)
 Anushtegin dynasty (AD 1215–1231) – 
 Qarlughid dynasty (AD 1224–1266)
 Chagatai Khanate (AD 1225–1370)
 Kart dynasty (AD 1244–1381)
 Ilkhanate (AD 1256–1353)
 Khalji dynasty (AD 1290–1320)
 Samma dynasty (AD 1351–1524)
 Timurid dynasty (AD 1370–1738) – 
 Safavid dynasty (AD 1510–1709)
 Arghun dynasty (AD 1520–1554)
 Tarkhan dynasty (AD 1554–1591)
 Katoor dynasty (AD 1570–1947)
 Hotak dynasty (AD 1709–1738)
 Afsharid dynasty (AD 1738–1747)
 Durrani dynasty (AD 1747–1826, AD 1839–1842) – 
 Barakzai dynasty (AD 1823–1839, AD 1842–1973) – 
 Musahiban (AD 1929–1973)

Anatolia (Asia Minor)

 Hittite Empire (c. 1600–1178 BC)
 Heraclid dynasty (12th century–687 BC)
 Adaside dynasty (911–745 BC) – 
 House of Suhi (10th century–848 BC) – 
 House of Astiruwa (848–717 BC) – 
 Sargonid dynasty (722–609 BC) – 
 Pre-Sargonid dynasty (745–722 BC) – 
 Mermnad dynasty (680–546 BC)
 Median dynasty (678–549 BC)
 Achaemenid dynasty (550–330 BC) – 
 Mithridatic dynasty (281 BC–AD 62) – 
 Pharnacid dynasty (480–320 BC)
 Hecatomnids (395–334 BC)
 Argead dynasty (334–305 BC) – 
 Ariarathid dynasty (331–96 BC) – 
 Antigonid dynasty (306–286 BC, 276–168 BC) – 
 Antipatrid dynasty (305–294 BC, 279–276 BC) – 
 Attalid dynasty (282–129 BC) – 
 Arsacid dynasty (247 BC–AD 224) – 
 Seleucid dynasty (200–188 BC) – 
 House of Ariobarzanes (96–36 BC) – 
 House of Archelaus (36 BC–AD 17) – 
 House of Odaenathus (AD 270–273) – 
 Constantinian dynasty (AD 330–363) – 
 Valentinianic dynasty (AD 364–379) – 
 Theodosian dynasty (AD 379–457) – 
 Leonid dynasty (AD 457–518) – 
 Justinian dynasty (AD 518–602) – 
 Heraclian dynasty (AD 610–711) – 
 Isurian dynasty (AD 717–802) – 
 Bohtan (AD 8th century–1847)
 Nikephorian dynasty (AD 802–813) – 
 Amorian dynasty (AD 820–867) – 
 Kaysite dynasty (AD 860–964)
 Macedonian dynasty (AD 867–1056) – 
 Sajid dynasty (AD 889–929)
 Seljuq dynasty (AD 1037–1308) – 
 Principality of Eğil (AD 1049–1864)
 Doukid dynasty (AD 1059–1081) – 
 Danishmendid dynasty (AD 1071–1178)
 Saltukids (AD 1071–1202)
 House of Mengüjek (AD 1072–1277)
 Erzincan branch (AD 1142–1228)
 Divriği branch (AD 1142–1277)
 Rubenids (AD 1080–1226) – 
 Beylik of Smyrna (AD 1081–1098)
 Komnenos dynasty (AD 1081–1185) – 
 Beylik of Çubukoğulları (AD 1085–1112)
 Beylik of Dilmaç (AD 1085–1398)
 Inalids (AD 1095–1183)
 Hauteville family (AD 1098–1163) – 
 Artuqid dynasty (AD 1101–1409)
 Mardin branch (AD 1101–1409)
 Aleppo subbranch (AD 1117–1128)
 Hasankeyf branch (AD 1102–1233)
 Harput branch (AD 1185–1234)
 Shah-Armens (AD 1110–1207)
 Zengid dynasty (AD 1128–1183)
 House of Poitiers (AD 1163–1268) – 
 Principality of Bitlis (AD 1182–19th century)
 Angelos dynasty (AD 1185–1204) – 
 House of Flanders (AD 1204–1216) – 
 Laskarid dynasty (AD 1204–1261) – 
 Capetian House of Courtenay (AD 1216–1261) – 
 Hethumids (AD 1226–1341) – 
 Chobanids (AD 1227–1309)
 Emirate of Bingöl (AD 1231–1864)
 Emirate of Hasankeyf (AD 1232–1524)
 Karamanid dynasty (AD 1250–1487)
 Ilkhanate (AD 1256–1353)
 Menteshe (AD 1261–1424)
 Palaiologos dynasty (AD 1261–1453) – 
 Beylik of Lâdik (AD 1262–1391)
 Sahib Ataids (AD 1275–1341)
 Pervâneoğlu (AD 1277–1322)
 Eshrefids (AD 1280–1326)
 Isfendiyarid dynasty (AD 1292–1461)
 Alaiye (AD 1293–1471)
 Karasid dynasty (AD 1296–1357)
 Ottoman dynasty (AD 1299–1924) – 
 Osmanoğlu family – 
 Emirate of Çemişgezek (AD 13th century–1663)
 Hamidid dynasty (AD 1300–1391)
 Tekeoğulları dynasty (AD 1321–1423)
 Sarukhanid dynasty (AD 1300–1410)
 Germiyanids (AD 1300–1429)
 Tacettinoğulları dynasty (AD 1308–1425)
 Aydınid dynasty (AD 1308–1426)
 Sutayids (AD 1312–1351)
 Hacıemiroğulları dynasty (AD 1313–1392)
 Eretnids (AD 1335–1381)
 Principality of Zirqan (AD 1335–1835)
 Beylik of Dulkadir (AD 1337–1522)
 Kutluşah dynasty (AD 1340–1393)
 House of Poitiers-Lusignan (AD 1342–1448) – 
 Qara Qoyunlu (AD 1374–1468)
 Bahdinan (AD 1376–1843)
 Aq Qoyunlu (AD 1378–1501)
 Beylik of Erzincan (AD 1379–1410)
 Emirate of Hakkâri (AD 14th century–1847)
 Principality of Mahmudi (AD 1406–1839)
 Beylik of Afshar (AD 1480–1534)
 Emirate of Palu (AD 1495–1850)
 Emirate of Pazooka (AD 1499–1587)
 Principality of Suleyman (AD 15th century–1838)
 Maeoniae dynasty (?–?)

Armenia

 Orontid dynasty
 Artaxiad dynasty or the Artashesi Dynasty (189 BC-12 AD)
 Arsacid dynasty of Armenia or the Arshakuni Dynasty (54–428)
 Siunia dynasty
 House of Hasan-Jalalyan
 Bagratuni dynasty or the Bagratid Dynasty of Armenia (885–1045)
 Rubenid dynasty of the Armenian Kingdom of Cilicia (1080–1225)
 Zakarids–Mkhargrdzeli (1201–1360) – 
 House of Lusignan, the Armenian Kingdom of Cilicia (1342–1467)
 Kara Koyunlu (1374–1468)
 Javanshir clan (1748–1822) – 
 House of Holstein-Gottorp-Romanov (1828–1917) –

Azerbaijan
 Arsacid dynasty of Caucasian Albania – 
 Mihranids
 Mazyadid dynasty
 Shaddadids (951–1199)
 Rawadid dynasty (955–1116)
 Seljuq dynasty
 Eldiguzids
 Javanshir clan (1748–1822) – 
 House of Black Monk – 
 Khanates of the Caucasus
 House of Holstein-Gottorp-Romanov (1813–1917) –

Bahrain
 Achaemenid dynasty (550–330 BC)
 Arsacid dynasty (247 BC–AD 224)
 House of Sasan (AD 224–590, AD 591–651)
 House of Mihran (AD 590–591, AD 629)
 House of Ispahbudhan (AD 591–596, AD 630–631)
 Umayyad dynasty (AD 661–750)
 Abbasid Caliphate (AD 750–899)
 Uyunid dynasty (AD 1076–1253)
 Usfurids (AD 1253–1320)
 Jarwanid dynasty (AD 14th century–15th century)
 Jabrids (AD 15th century–16th century)
 House of Aviz-Beja (AD 1521–1580) – 
 Philippine dynasty (AD 1581–1602) – 
 Safavid dynasty (AD 1602–1717)
 Afsharid dynasty (AD 1736–1753)
  (AD 1783–present)

Bhutan

  (དབང་ཕྱུག་རྒྱལ་བརྒྱུད་) (1907–present)

Brunei

  (1368–present)

Cambodia

  (13th century–present)
  (1860–1904, 1941–1970, 1993–present)
 House of Sisowath (1904–1941)
 Imperial House of Japan (1941–1945) –

Central Asia
 House of Diodotus (255–223 BC) – 
 Euthydemid dynasty (230 BC–AD 10) – 
 Luandi clan (209 BC–AD 93) – 
 House of Eucratides (170–130 BC) – 
 Xianbei state (c. AD 93–234)
 Sasanian dynasty (AD 224–651) – 
 Afrighid dynasty (AD 305–995)
 Kidarites (AD 320–500)
 Ashina tribe (AD 552–657) – 
 Tokhara Yabghus (AD 625–758)
 Tang dynasty (AD 640–690, AD 705–790) – 
 Wu Zhou (AD 690–705) – 
 Ikhshids of Sogdia (AD 642–755)
 Bukhar Khudahs (AD 681–890)
 Aje clan (AD 693–1207) – 
 Principality of Chaghaniyan (AD 7th century–8th century)
 Principality of Khuttal (AD 7th century–750)
 Principality of Farghana (AD 8th century–819)
 Karluk Yabghu State (AD 756–840)
 Oghuz Yabgu State (AD 766–1055)
 Samanid Empire (AD 819–999)
 Kara-Khanid Khanate (AD 840–1212)
 Eastern Kara-Khanid (AD 1032–1210)
 Western Kara-Khanid (AD 1041–1212)
 Banijurids (AD 848–908)
 Ghurid dynasty (c. AD 879–1215)
 Principality of Ushrusana (?–AD 892)
 Ghaznavid dynasty (AD 977–1186)
 Ma'munid dynasty (AD 995–1017)
 Muhtajids (AD 10th century–11th century)
 Seljuq dynasty (AD 1037–1194) – 
 Anushtegin dynasty (AD 1077–1231) – 
 Western Liao dynasty (AD 1124–1218) – 
 Mongol Empire (AD 1207–1368)
 House of Ögedei (AD 1225–1309)
 Chagatai Khanate (AD 1225–1346)
 Western Chagatai Khanate (AD 1346–1402)
 Moghulistan (AD 1347–1680)
 Yarkent Khanate (AD 1514–1705)
 Golden Horde (AD 1242–1502)
 Shaybanid dynasty (AD 1428–1883)
 Manghit dynasty (AD 1785–1920) – 
 Nogai Horde (AD 1440s–1634)
 Kazakh Khanate (AD 1465–1848)
 Bukey Horde (AD 1801–1849)
 Ilkhanate (AD 1256–1353)
 Kart dynasty (AD 1244–1381)
 Sufi dynasty (AD 1361–1379)
 Timurid dynasty (AD 1370–1507) – 
 Khanate of Khiva (AD 1511–1920)
 Janid dynasty (AD 1599–1747)
 Hotak dynasty (AD 1709–1738)
 Khanate of Kokand (AD 1709–1876)
 Durrani dynasty (AD 1747–1826) – 
 Qing dynasty (AD 1759–1912) – 
 House of Holstein-Gottorp-Romanov (AD 1867–1917) –

Chagos Archipelago
 House of Bourbon-Vendôme (AD 1715–1792) – 
 House of Bonaparte (AD 1804–1814) – 
 House of Hanover (AD 1814–1901) – 
 House of Saxe-Coburg and Gotha (AD 1901–1917) – 
  (AD 1917–present) –

Champa

 1st dynasty (192–336)
 2nd dynasty (336–420)
 3rd dynasty (420–529)
 4th dynasty (529–758)
 5th dynasty (758–854)
 6th dynasty (854–989)
 7th dynasty (989–1044)
 8th dynasty (1044–1074)
 9th dynasty (1074–1139)
 10th dynasty (1139–1145)
 11th dynasty (1145–1190)
 12th dynasty (1190–1318)
 13th dynasty (1318–1390)
 14th dynasty (1390–1458)
 15th dynasty (1458–1471)
 Dynasty of Po Saktiraidaputih (1695–1822)

China

 Three Sovereigns and Five Emperors (?–2070 BC) – 
 Taotang-shi (?–?) – 
 Youyu-shi (?–?) – 
 Xia dynasty (2070–1600 BC) – 
 Shang dynasty (1600–1046 BC) – 
 Jizi Chaoxian (1120–194 BC) – 
 Zhou dynasty (1046–256 BC) – 
 Western Zhou (1046–771 BC)
 Eastern Zhou (770–256 BC)
 Zhangzhung (500 BC–AD 625)
 Minyue (334–111 BC) – 
 Dian Kingdom (278–109 BC)
 Fuyu (239 BC–AD 494)
 Northern Fuyu (239–58 BC)
 Zuben Fuyu (86–37 BC)
 Eastern Fuyu (86 BC–AD 22)
 Later Fuyu (AD 22–494)
 Pre-Qin dynastic fiefs (?–221 BC)
 Ancient Shu (2500–316 BC)
 Cancong dynasty (2500 BC–?)
 Boguan dynasty (?–1700 BC)
 Yufu dynasty (1700–1200 BC)
 Duyu dynasty (1200–600 BC)
 Kaiming dynasty (600–316 BC)
 Yue (2032–222 BC) – 
 Mixu (21st century–10th century BC) – 
 Dong (21st century–7th century BC) – 
 Guzhu (1600–660 BC) – 
 Qi (16th century–445 BC) – 
 Deng (1200–678 BC) – 
 Xi (1122–680 BC) – 
 E (12th century–863 BC) – 
 Quan (12th century–704 BC) – 
 Wu (1096–473 BC) – 
 Bei (?–1059 BC) – 
 Guan (1046–1039 BC) – 
 Feng (1046–1023 BC) – 
 Jiao (1046–775 BC) – 
 Zhu (1046–768 BC) – 
 Eastern Guo (1046–767 BC) – 
 Su (1046–684 BC) – 
 Tan (1046–684 BC) – 
 Huo (1046–661 BC) – 
 Shu (1046–657 BC) – 
 Yu (1046–655 BC) – 
 Western Guo (1046–655 BC) – 
 Northern Guo (?–?)
 Southern Guo (?–?)
 Wen (1046–650 BC) – 
 Ying (1046–646 BC) – 
 Yuan (1046–635 BC) – 
 Lu (1046–622 BC) – 
 Shuliao (1046–601 BC) – 
 Genmou (1046–600 BC) – 
 Xun (1046–7th century BC) – 
 Shuyong (1046–574 BC) – 
 Shujiu (1046–548 BC) – 
 Mao (1046–516 BC) – 
 Pan (1046–504 BC) – 
 Dun (1046–496 BC) – 
 Cao (1046–487 BC) – 
 Cai (1046–447 BC) – 
 Ju (1046–431 BC) – 
 Cheng (1046–408 BC) – 
 Xu (1046–375 BC) – 
 Ba (1046–316 BC) – 
 Teng (1046–297 BC) – 
 Zou (1046–281 BC) – 
 Yan (1046–222 BC) – 
 Qi (1046–221 BC)
 Jiang Qi (1046–386 BC) – 
 Tian Qi (386–221 BC) – 
 Zhou (?–1046 BC) – 
 Shao (1046 BC–?) – 
 Bi (1046 BC–?) – 
 Zhou (1046 BC–?) – 
 Rong (1046 BC–?) – 
 Yong (1046 BC–?) – 
 Rui (1046 BC–?) – 
 Northern Rui (1046–640 BC)
 Southern Rui (806 BC–?)
 Han (1046 BC–?)
 Ji (1046 BC–?) – 
 Chunyu (1046 BC–?) – 
 Gao (1046 BC–?) – 
 Mao (1046 BC–?) – 
 Shulong (1046 BC–?) – 
 Shugong (1046 BC–?) – 
 Shubao (1046 BC–?) – 
 Wan (1046 BC–?) – 
 Lu (1046 BC–?)
 Chen (1045–478 BC) – 
 Lu (1043–249 BC) – 
 Ji (1040–750 BC) – 
 Xing (1040–635 BC) – 
 Jiang (1040–623 BC) – 
 Jiang (1040–617 BC) – 
 Shen (1040–506 BC) – 
 Song (1040–286 BC) – 
 Wei (1040–209 BC) – 
 Zuo (1040 BC–?) – 
 Dan (1040 BC–?) – 
 Pugu (?–1039 BC)
 Jin (1033–376 BC) – 
 Yi (745–679 BC)
 Quwo (745–679 BC)
 Ying (1030–646 BC) – 
 Chu (1030–223 BC) – 
 Yuezhang (880 BC–?)
 Later Chu (208–206 BC)
 Yin (1027–1024 BC) – 
 Yang (1020–677 BC) – 
 Nuo (11th century–704 BC) – 
 Luo (11th century–690 BC) – 
 Jia (11th century–678 BC) – 
 Hao (11th century–7th century BC) – 
 Ji (11th century–7th century BC) – 
 Lai (11th century–538 BC) – 
 Wei (11th century BC–?) – 
 Pi (11th century BC–?) – 
 Qin (905–207 BC) – 
 Sui (10th century BC–?) – 
 Xie (?–841 BC) – 
 Shen (841 BC–?) – 
 Zhan (827 BC–?) – 
 Zheng (806–375 BC) – 
 Daluo (?–9th century BC) – 
 Lan (781–521 BC) – 
 Yin (770–513 BC) – 
 Kuai (?–769 BC) – 
 Liang (768–641 BC) – 
 Hu (?–763 BC) – 
 Han (?–757 BC) – 
 Ji (?–721 BC) – 
 Xiang (?–721 BC) – 
 Yiqu (720–272 BC) – 
 Fan (?–716 BC) – 
 Dai (?–713 BC) – 
 Jiao (?–700 BC) – 
 Gu (?–8th century BC) – 
 Zhongli (8th century–601 BC) – 
 Ni (8th century–335 BC) – 
 Xiaozhu (653–335 BC)
 Yuyuqiu (?–692 BC)
 Ji (?–690 BC) – 
 Lu (?–690 BC) – 
 Lesser Guo (?–687 BC) – 
 Sui (?–681 BC) – 
 Xiao (681–597 BC) – 
 Guo (?–670 BC)
 Lirong (?–666 BC) – 
 Zhang (?–664 BC) – 
 Lingzhi (?–664 BC)
 Geng (?–661 BC) – 
 Wei (?–661 BC) – 
 Gong (?–660 BC) – 
 Yang (?–660 BC) – 
 Xian (?–655 BC) – 
 Guang (?–650 BC) – 
 Huang (?–648 BC) – 
 Xiang (?–643 BC)
 Bai (?–640 BC) – 
 Fan (?–635 BC) – 
 Kui (?–634 BC) – 
 Hua (?–627 BC) – 
 Liao (?–622 BC) – 
 Xuqu (?–620 BC) – 
 Yu (?–612 BC) – 
 Yong (?–611 BC)
 Jun (?–611 BC)
 Li (?–604 BC) – 
 Lushi (604–594 BC) – 
 Western Huang (?–7th century BC)
 Liu (592–488 BC) – 
 Qianggaoru (?–588 BC) – 
 Zhuan (?–585 BC)
 Zeng (?–567 BC) – 
 Lai (?–567 BC) – 
 Biyang (?–563 BC) – 
 Wangshu (?–563 BC) – 
 Shi (?–560 BC) – 
 Yin (?–532 BC)
 Fei (?–530 BC) – 
 Fang (?–529 BC) – 
 Zhoulai (?–529 BC) – 
 Yang (?–528 BC) – 
 Gu (?–520 BC) – 
 Chao (?–518 BC) – 
 Gong (?–516 BC) – 
 Xu (?–512 BC) – 
 Zhongshan (507–406 BC, 380–296 BC) – 
 Xianyu (?–506 BC) – 
 Tang (?–505 BC) – 
 Hu (?–496 BC) – 
 Gumie (?–480 BC)
 Zhongwu (?–471 BC)
 Western Zhou (440–256 BC) – 
 Tan (?–414 BC) – 
 Han (403–230 BC) – 
 Wei (403–225 BC) – 
 Zhao (403–222 BC) – 
 Zeng (?–5th century BC) – 
 Chouyou (?–5th century BC)
 Mianzhu (?–395 BC)
 Ju (368–316 BC)
 Eastern Zhou (367–249 BC) – 
 Xue (?–298 BC) – 
 Dai (228–222 BC) – 
 Baidi (?–?) – 
 Chidi (?–?)
 Changdi (?–?) – 
 Souman (?–?)
 Jiuli (?–?) – 
 Sanmiao (?–?) – 
 Gunyi (?–?)
 Yuyi (?–?)
 Fangyi (?–?)
 Huangyi (?–?)
 Baiyi (?–?)
 Chiyi (?–?)
 Xuanyi (?–?)
 Fengyi (?–?)
 Yangyi (?–?)
 Dirong (?–?)
 Huanrong (?–?)
 Maorong (?–?)
 Shenrong (?–?)
 Rong of Dali (?–?)
 Rong of Yun clan (?–?) – 
 Luhun (?–?)
 Yinrong (?–?)
 Rong of Yiluo (?–?)
 Rong of Jiuzhou (?–?)
 Wushi (?–?)
 Quyan (?–?)
 Shangfang (?–?) – 
 Zifang (?–?)
 Tufang (?–?)
 Hongfang (?–?)
 Guifang (?–?)
 Kufang (?–?)
 Longfang (?–?)
 Mafang (?–?)
 Shufang (?–?)
 Yufang (?–?)
 Eastern Yufang (?–?)
 Western Yufang (?–?)
 Qiangfang (?–?)
 Zhafang (?–?)
 Peifang (?–?)
 Erbangfang (?–?)
 Renfang (?–?)
 Tangfang (?–?)
 Linfang (?–?)
 Xingfang (?–?)
 Shifang (?–?)
 Weifang (?–?)
 Pangfang (?–?)
 Gefang (?–?)
 Mufang (?–?)
 Zhoufang (?–?)
 Genfang (?–?)
 Jifang (?–?)
 Yafang (?–?)
 Shifang (?–?)
 Zhaofang (?–?)
 Jianfang (?–?)
 Yinfang (?–?)
 Jifang (?–?)
 Hufang (?–?)
 Weifang (?–?)
 Bufang (?–?)
 Xifang (?–?)
 Diefang (?–?)
 Zhifang (?–?)
 Yinfang (?–?)
 Zengfang (?–?)
 Zhufang (?–?)
 Nongfang (?–?)
 Chuifang (?–?)
 Chefang (?–?)
 Quefang (?–?)
 Shifang (?–?)
 Yufang (?–?)
 Xiufang (?–?)
 Beifang (?–?)
 Cangfang (?–?)
 Yangfang (?–?)
 Foufang (?–?)
 Pengfang (?–?)
 Songfang (?–?)
 Danfang (?–?)
 Xiangfang (?–?)
 Youmin-shi (?–?) – 
 Youshi-shi (?–?)
 Zhenxun-shi (?–?) – 
 Youhu-shi (?–?) – 
 Younan-shi (?–?) – 
 Tongcheng-shi (?–?) – 
 Zhenguan-shi (?–?) – 
 Youxin-shi (?–?) – 
 Youxiong-shi (?–?)
 Youjiao-shi (?–?)
 Bao-shi (?–?)
 Fei-shi (?–?)
 Qi-shi (?–?)
 Zeng-shi (?–?)
 Xin-shi (?–?)
 Ming-shi (?–?)
 Ge-shi (?–?)
 Youqiong-shi (?–?)
 Youge-shi (?–?)
 Boming-shi (?–?) – 
 Ji (?–?)
 Ji (?–?)
 You (?–?) – 
 Ji (?–?)
 Shen (?–?)
 Gao (?–?)
 Er (?–?)
 Feng (?–?)
 Bao (?–?)
 Shu (?–?)
 Zhu (?–?)
 Dun (?–?)
 Tui (?–?)
 Ke (?–?)
 Chou (?–?)
 Gu (?–?)
 Er (?–?)
 Mao (?–?)
 Feng (?–?)
 He (?–?)
 Bing (?–?)
 Xian (?–?)
 Hao (?–?)
 Li (?–?)
 Nuo (?–?)
 Gu (?–?) – 
 Lu (?–?)
 Jian (?–?)
 Quanrong (?–?)
 Rong of Jiang clan (?–?) – 
 Jiangrong (?–?)
 Lu (?–?)
 Jiuyuan (?–?)
 Shangsi (?–?)
 Xiawei (?–?)
 Northern Qi (?–?) – 
 Zhi (?–?)
 Lü (?–?) – 
 Southern Yan (?–?) – 
 Ge (?–?) – 
 Shan (?–?) – 
 Gan (?–?) – 
 Bi (?–?) – 
 Mi (?–?) – 
 Yu (?–?) – 
 Du (?–?) – 
 Bulang (?–?) – 
 Eastern Bulang (?–?)
 Western Bulang (?–?)
 Dao (?–?)
 Chong (?–?) – 
 Di (?–?) – 
 Ji (?–?) – 
 Yan (?–?)
 Chou (?–?) – 
 Shen (?–?) – 
 Si (?–?) – 
 Ru (?–?) – 
 Huang (?–?)
 Peng (?–?)
 Guan (?–?)
 Jiafu (?–?)
 Zhu (?–?) – 
 Ba (?–?) – 
 Nie (?–?) – 
 Yu (?–?) – 
 Jue (?–?)
 Ren (?–?) – 
 Mou (?–?)
 Guan (?–?) – 
 Han (?–?) – 
 Zong (?–?) – 
 Yan (?–?)
 Pang (?–?)
 Yi (?–?) – 
 Quegong (?–?)
 Zhuanyu (?–?) – 
 Fei (?–?) – 
 Ruo (?–?)
 Lower Ruo (?–622 BC)
 Upper Ruo (622 BC–?)
 Zhi (?–?) – 
 Zhu (?–?) – 
 Jie (?–?) – 
 Kan (?–?)
 You (?–?) – 
 Zong (?–?) – 
 Guo (?–?) – 
 Rong of Ji clan (?–?) – 
 Zhen (?–?) – 
 Yun (?–?) – 
 Dai (?–?) – 
 Fengfu (?–?) – 
 Anling (?–?)
 Mie (?–?)
 Er (?–?)
 Zhou (?–?) – 
 Tong (?–?) – 
 Peng (?–?)
 Wuzhong (?–?)
 Qin dynasty (221–207 BC) – 
 Zhang Chu (209–208 BC) – 
 Xiongnu confederation (209 BC–AD 48) – 
 Northern Xiongnu (AD 48–155)
 Southern Xiongnu (AD 48–216)
 Eighteen Kingdoms (208–202 BC)
 Han (208–205 BC) – 
 Sai (206 BC) – 
 Di (206 BC) – 
 Liaodong (206 BC) – 
 Jiaodong (206 BC) – 
 Qi (206 BC) – 
 Jibei (206 BC) – 
 Yong (206–205 BC) – 
 Western Wei (206–205 BC) – 
 Henan (206–205 BC) – 
 Yin (206–205 BC) – 
 Changshan (206–205 BC) – 
 Dai (206–205 BC)
 Linjiang (206–203 BC) – 
 Jiujiang (206–203 BC) – 
 Han (206–202 BC) – 
 Hengshan (206–202 BC) – 
 Yan (206–202 BC) – 
 Western Chu (206–202 BC) – 
 Dynastic fiefs under the Han dynasty (205 BC–AD 9, AD 23–221)
 Non-cognate dynastic fiefs under the Han dynasty (205–157 BC)
 Han (205–200 BC) – 
 Qi (203–202 BC) – 
 Huainan (203–196 BC) – 
 Zhao (203–198 BC, 180 BC) – 
 Chu (202–201 BC)
 Liang (202–196 BC) – 
 Yan (202–196 BC, 180 BC) – 
 Changsha (202–157 BC) – 
 Lü (187–180 BC) – 
 Lu (187–180 BC) – 
 Cognate dynastic fiefs under the Han dynasty (201 BC–AD 9, AD 23–221) – 
 Jing (201–196 BC)
 Qi (201–127 BC, 117–110 BC)
 Chu (201–69 BC, 50 BC–AD 9)
 Dai (200–198 BC, 196–114 BC)
 Zhao (198–181 BC, 179–154 BC, 152 BC–AD 9)
 Huainan (196–174 BC, 168–165 BC, 164–122 BC)
 Liang (196–181 BC, 180 BC, 178 BC–AD 3, AD 5–9)
 Wu (195–154 BC)
 Yan (195–181 BC, 179–127 BC, 117–80 BC)
 Hengshan (187–180 BC)
 Huaiyang (187–180 BC, 176–169 BC, 155–154 BC, 63 BC–AD 9)
 Langya (181–179 BC)
 Jichuan (181–180 BC, 144–138 BC)
 Taiyuan (178–176 BC)
 Jibei (178–177 BC, 164–154 BC, 153–87 BC)
 Chengyang (178–169 BC, 165 BC–AD 9)
 Hejian (178–165 BC, 155 BC–AD 9)
 Jinan (164–154 BC)
 Lujiang (164–153 BC)
 Hengshan (164–122 BC)
 Jiaoxi (164–108 BC)
 Jiaodong (164–150 BC, 148 BC–AD 9)
 Zichuan (164 BC–AD 9)
 Runan (155–153 BC)
 Linjiang (155–153 BC, 150–148 BC)
 Guangchuan (155–152 BC, 148–70 BC, 66–50 BC)
 Changsha (155 BC–AD 9)
 Lu (154–6 BC, 4 BC–AD 9)
 Zhongshan (154–54 BC, 44–35 BC, 23–1 BC, AD 1–9)
 Jiangdu (153–121 BC)
 Qinghe (147–136 BC, 114–66 BC, 47–44 BC)
 Changshan (145–113 BC)
 Jiyin (144–143 BC)
 Jidong (144–116 BC)
 Shanyang (144–136 BC, 33–25 BC)
 Liu'an (121 BC–AD 9)
 Guangling (117–54 BC, 47–17 BC, 11 BC–AD 9)
 Zhending (114 BC–AD 9)
 Sishui (113 BC–AD 9)
 Changyi (97–74 BC)
 Pinggan (91–56 BC)
 Guangyang (73 BC–AD 9)
 Gaomi (73 BC–AD 9)
 Dingtao (52–50 BC, 25–5 BC)
 Dongping (52–4 BC, AD 1–7)
 Jiyang (41–33 BC)
 Xindu (37–23 BC, 5 BC–AD 9)
 Guangde (19–18 BC, AD 2–9)
 Guangping (4 BC–AD 9)
 Guangshi (AD 2–9)
 Guangzong (AD 2–9)
 Nanyue (204–111 BC) – 
 Han dynasty (202 BC–AD 9, AD 23–220) – 
 Western Han (202 BC–AD 9)
 Xuan Han (AD 23–25)
 Chimei Han (AD 25–27)
 Eastern Han (AD 25–220)
 Yelang (3rd century–27 BC)
 Ailao (3rd century BC–AD 76)
 Nanhai (195–174 BC)
 Weiman Chaoxian (194–108 BC) – 
 Dong'ou (191–138 BC) – 
 Yarlung dynasty (127 BC–AD 618) – 
 Wusun (117 BC–?)
 Gouding (111 BC–AD 316)
 Dongming (?–108 BC)
 Woju (2nd century BC–AD 5th century)
 Eastern Woju (?–?)
 Northern Woju (?–?)
 Gaogouli (37 BC–AD 668) – 
 Lelang (1st century BC–AD 47)
 Gaima (1st century BC–AD 1st century)
 Goutu (1st century BC–AD 1st century)
 Xin dynasty (AD 9–23) – 
 Chengjia (AD 25–36) – 
 Lu Han (AD 25–?) – 
 Lu Dai (AD 40–?)
 Northern Daifang (?–AD 27)
 Xianbei state (AD 93–234)
 Northern Xianbei (AD ?–?)
 Western Xianbei (AD ?–?)
 Eastern Xianbei (AD ?–?)
 Shaodang Qiang (?–AD 139)
 Zhongjia (AD 197–199) – 
 Bailan (AD 2nd century–?)
 Three Kingdoms (AD 220–280)
 Cao Wei (AD 220–266) – 
 Shu Han (AD 221–263) – 
 Eastern Wu (AD 222–280) – 
 Tuoba tribe (AD 220–310) – 
 Dai (AD 310–376)
 Yan (AD 237–238) – 
 Duan tribe (AD 250–356) – 
 Liaoxi (AD 313–338)
 Duan Qi (AD 350–356)
 Duan Zhao (AD 352)
 Longxi tribe (AD 265–376) – 
 Jin dynasty (AD 266–420) – 
 Western Jin (AD 266–316)
 Eastern Jin (AD 317–420)
 Tuyuhun (AD 284–608, AD 615–663) – 
 Qiuchi (AD 296–371, AD 385–442, AD 443–477, AD 478–580) – 
 Former Qiuchi (AD 296–371)
 Later Qiuchi (AD 385–442)
 Wudu (AD 443–477)
 Wuxing (AD 478–506, AD 529–553)
 Yinping (AD 479–580)
 Mu'ege (AD 300–1698) – 
 Chiefdom of Shuixi (AD 1279–1698)
 Sixteen Kingdoms (AD 304–439)
 Han Zhao (AD 304–329) – 
 Northern Han (AD 304–319)
 Former Zhao (AD 319–329)
 Cheng Han (AD 304–347) – 
 Chengdu (AD 304–306)
 Cheng (AD 306–338)
 Han (AD 338–347)
 Later Zhao (AD 319–351) – 
 Wei (AD 350)
 Former Liang (AD 320–376) – 
 Xiping (AD 324–353, AD 355, AD 361–376)
 Former Yan (AD 337–370) – 
 Former Qin (AD 351–394) – 
 Later Yan (AD 384–409) – 
 Later Qin (AD 384–417) – 
 Western Qin (AD 385–400, AD 409–431) – 
 Yuanchuan (AD 387–388)
 Henan (AD 388–389, AD 394, AD 411–414)
 Jincheng (AD 389–394)
 Liang (AD 394–395)
 Later Liang (AD 386–403) – 
 Jiuquan (AD 386–389)
 Sanhe (AD 389–396)
 Southern Liang (AD 397–404, AD 408–414) – 
 Xiping (AD 397–398)
 Wuwei (AD 398–401)
 Hexi (AD 401–402)
 Northern Liang (AD 397–439) – 
 Jiankang (AD 397–399)
 Zhangye (AD 401–412)
 Hexi (AD 412–431, AD 433–439)
 Northern Liang of Gaochang (AD 442–460)
 Southern Yan (AD 398–410) – 
 Western Liang (AD 400–421) – 
 Later Western Liang (AD 422–442)
 Hu Xia (AD 407–431) – 
 Northern Yan (AD 407–436) – 
 Dingling state (AD 330–388) – 
 Rouran Khaganate (AD 330–555) – 
 Cuan-shi (AD 330–580) – 
 Western Cuan (AD 580–786)
 Eastern Cuan (AD 672–748)
 Yuwen tribe (?–AD 345) – 
 Ran Wei (AD 350–352) – 
 Western Yan (AD 384–394) – 
 Xianyu Zhao (AD 385) – 
 Northern and Southern dynasties (AD 386–589)
 Northern dynasties (AD 386–581)
 Northern Wei (AD 386–535) – 
 Eastern Wei (AD 534–550)
 Western Wei (AD 535–557)
 Northern Qi (AD 550–577) – 
 Northern Zhou (AD 557–581) – 
 Southern dynasties (AD 420–589)
 Liu Song (AD 420–479) – 
 Southern Qi (AD 479–502) – 
 Liang dynasty (AD 502–557) – 
 Western Liang (AD 555–587)
 Eastern Liang (AD 558–560)
 Chen dynasty (AD 557–589) – 
 Zhai Wei (AD 388–392) – 
 Southern Daifang (AD 4th century–5th century)
 Huan Chu (AD 403–404) – 
 Western Shu (AD 405–413) – 
 Tiefu tribe (?–AD 407) – 
 Northern Jin (AD 414–415) – 
 Dengzhi (AD 430–554) – 
 Gaochang (AD 460–640)
 Kan-shi of Gaochang (AD 460–488) – 
 Zhang-shi of Gaochang (AD 488–496) – 
 Ma-shi of Gaochang (AD 496–501) – 
 Qu-shi of Gaochang (AD 501–640) – 
 Gaoche (AD 487–541) – 
 Hou Han (AD 551–552) – 
 First Turkic Khaganate (AD 552–581) – 
 Eastern Turkic Khaganate (AD 581–630)
 Later Eastern Turkic Khaganate (AD 639–681)
 Western Turkic Khaganate (AD 581–657)
 Möng Mao (AD 560–1604) – 
 Tanchang (?–AD 564) – 
 Sui dynasty (AD 581–619) – 
 Chiefdom of Sizhou (AD 582–1413) – 
 Chiefdom of Sinan (AD 1364–1414)
 Eastern Queendom (AD 6th century–8th century)
 Xueyantuo (AD 605–646) – 
 Lin Chu (AD 616–622) – 
 Xia (AD 617–621) – 
 Later Western Liang (AD 617–621) – 
 Liang (AD 617–628) – 
 Liang (AD 618–619) – 
 Xu (AD 618–619) – 
 Tibetan Empire (AD 618–842) – 
 Tang dynasty (AD 618–690, AD 705–907) – 
 Wu Zhou (AD 690–705) – 
 Zheng (AD 619–621) – 
 Wu (AD 619–621) – 
 Later Sui (AD 620–630) – 
 Tokhara Yabghus (AD 625–758) – 
 Tangmao (?–AD 632)
 Pugu tribe (AD 647–765) – 
 Second Turkic Khaganate (AD 682–745) – 
 Bohai (AD 698–926) – 
 Zhen (AD 698–713)
 Türgesh Khaganate (AD 699–766)
 Little Gaogouli (AD 699–820) – 
 Dahe-shi (?–AD 730) – 
 Yaonian-shi (AD 730–906) – 
 Uyghur Khaganate (AD 744–840) – 
 Yan (AD 756–763)
 Former Yan (AD 756–759) – 
 Later Yan (AD 759–763) – 
 Karluk Yabghus (AD 756–840) – 
 Ji (AD 782–784) – 
 Chu (AD 784–786) – 
 Six Zhao (?–AD 794)
 Mengsui Zhao (?–AD 730)
 Mengshe Zhao (?–AD 738) – 
 Nanzhao (AD 738–902)
 Dameng (AD 738–860)
 Dali (AD 860–877)
 Dafengmin (AD 878–902)
 Yuexi Zhao (?–AD 747)
 Shilang Zhao (?–AD 794)
 Langqiong Zhao (?–AD 794)
 Dengtan Zhao (?–AD 794)
 Yenisei Kyrgyz Khaganate (AD 840–1207) – 
 Kara-Khanid Khanate (AD 840–1212)
 Eastern Kara-Khanid (AD 1032–1210)
 Western Kara-Khanid (AD 1041–1212)
 Qocho Uyghur Kingdom (AD 843–1360)
 Guiyi Circuit (AD 851–1036) – 
 Xihan Jinshan (AD 910–?)
 Xihan Dunhuang (?–AD 914)
 Chiefdom of Bozhou (AD 876–1600) – 
 Era of Fragmentation of Tibet (AD 877–1264)
 Lhachen dynasty (AD 930–1460)
 Guge dynasty (AD 967–1635) – 
 Purang-Guge Kingdom (?–?)
 Yatse dynasty (AD 12th century–1801)
 Lhasa dynasty (?–?)
 Yarlung dynasty (?–?) – 
 Puhrang dynasty (?–?) – 
 Gungthang dynasty (?–?) – 
 Lhagyari dynasty (?–?)
 Huang Qi (AD 881–884) – 
 Ganzhou Uyghur Kingdom (AD 894–1036) – 
 Kucha Uyghur Kingdom (AD 9th century–11th century)
 Qi (AD 901–924) – 
 Later Three Dynasties of Yunnan (AD 902–937)
 Dachanghe (AD 902–928) – 
 Datianxing (AD 928–929) – 
 Dayining (AD 929–937) – 
 Liugu tribe (AD 906–1016)
 Shatuo tribe (?–AD 907) – 
 Zhao (AD 907–921) – 
 Five Dynasties and Ten Kingdoms (AD 907–979)
 Five Dynasties (AD 907–960)
 Later Liang (AD 907–923) – 
 Later Tang (AD 923–937) – 
 Former Jin (AD 907–923)
 Li Liang (AD 946–947)
 Later Jin (AD 936–947) – 
 Later Han (AD 947–951) – 
 Later Zhou (AD 951–960) – 
 Ten Kingdoms (AD 907–979)
 Former Shu (AD 907–925) – 
 Han (AD 917–918)
 Yang Wu (AD 907–937) – 
 Hongnong (AD 905–910)
 Ma Chu (AD 907–951) – 
 Wuyue (AD 907–978) – 
 Min (AD 909–945) – 
 Yin (AD 943–945)
 Southern Han (AD 917–971) – 
 Yue (AD 917)
 Jingnan (AD 924–963) – 
 Bohai (AD 913–924, AD 932–934)
 Nanping (AD 924–929, AD 934–960)
 Later Shu (AD 934–965) – 
 Southern Tang (AD 937–976) – 
 Xu Qi (AD 937–939)
 Jiangnan (AD 971–976)
 Northern Han (AD 951–979) – 
 Beiping (AD 909–929) – 
 Yan (AD 911–913) – 
 Liao dynasty (AD 916–1125) – 
 Northern Liao (AD 1122–1123)
 Northwestern Liao (AD 1123)
Western Liao (AD 1124–1218)
 Dongdan (AD 926–936) – 
 Later Bohai (AD 928–976) – 
 Dali (AD 937–1094, AD 1096–1253) – 
 Former Dali (AD 937–1094)
 Later Dali (AD 1096–1253)
 Ding'an (AD 938–986) – 
 Song dynasty (AD 960–1279) – 
 Northern Song (AD 960–1127)
 Southern Song (AD 1127–1279)
 Chiefdom of Shuidong (AD 975–1630) – 
 Restored Bohai (AD 979–1018) – 
 Li Shu (AD 994) – 
 Wure (AD 995–996) – 
 Five Nations (AD 1003–?)
 Pou'ali (?–?)
 Aolimi (?–?)
 Yuelidu (?–?)
 Pennuli (?–?)
 Yueliji (?–?)
 Xingliao (AD 1029–1030) – 
 Changqi (AD 1029–1055) – 
 Dali (AD 1041–1045)
 Nantian (AD 1045–1052)
 Danan (AD 1052–1055)
 Tsongkha (AD 1032–1104) – 
 Western Xia (AD 1038–1227) – 
 Luoshi Kingdom (AD 1042–1278)
 Shazhou Uyghur Kingdom (?–AD 1071)
 Dazhong (AD 1094–1096) – 
 Chiefdom of Yao'an (AD 1147–1729)
 Chiefdom of Heqing (AD 1253–1437)
 Chiefdom of Yongsheng (?–AD 1946)
 Keraite state (AD 11th century–13th century)
 Chiefdom of Lingtsang (AD 11th century–1959)
 Ziqi (AD 1100–1259)
 Jin dynasty (AD 1115–1234) – 
 Great Bohai (AD 1116) – 
 Xi (AD 1123) – 
 Chu (AD 1127) – 
 Liu Qi (AD 1130–1137) – 
 Khamag Mongol (AD 1148–1171) – 
 Former Northwestern Liao (AD 1161–1164) – 
 Ren Chu (AD 1170) – 
 Chiefdom of Nangqên (AD 1175–1955) – 
 Chiang Hung (AD 1180–1950)
 Chiefdom of Cheli (AD 1384–?)
 Later Northwestern Liao (AD 1196) – 
 Chiefdom of Luowu (AD 12th century–20th century) – 
 Naiman state (?–AD 1206) – 
 Northern Naiman (AD 1198–1204)
 Southern Naiman (AD 1198–1206)
 Mongol Empire (AD 1206–1368) – 
 Ögedei Khanate (AD 1225–1309)
 Chagatai Khanate (AD 1225–1346)
 Western Chagatai Khanate (AD 1346–1402)
 Eastern Chagatai Khanate (AD 1347–1680)
 Beshbalik (AD 1389–1418)
 Ili Baliq (AD 1418–1508)
 Turpan Khanate (AD 1487–1570)
 Yarkent Khanate (AD 1514–1705)
 Yuan dynasty (AD 1271–1368)
 Northern Yuan (AD 1368–1635)
 Tatar state (AD 1388–1635)
 Tüsheet Khanate (AD 1691–1923)
 Setsen Khanate (AD 1691–1923)
 Jasaghtu Khanate (AD 1691–1923)
 Altan Khanate (AD 1609–1691)
 Sain Noyan Khanate (AD 1731–1923)
 Wu Shu (AD 1207) – 
 Eastern Liao (AD 1213–1269) – 
 Later Liao (AD 1216–1219)
 Eastern Xia (AD 1215–1233) – 
 Möng Kawng (AD 1215–1796)
 Kingdom of Mangalai (AD 1220–1877)
 Laduijiang (AD 1227–1610)
 Sakya dynasty (AD 1253–1358) – 
 Ningzhou Tuzhizhou (AD 1254–?) – 
 Chiefdom of Luomeng (AD 1255–1270) – 
 Chiefdom of Menggen (AD 1263–1959) – 
 Two Petty Principalities under the Yuan dynasty (AD 1269–?) – 
 Principality of Xiping (AD 1269–?)
 Principality of Liang (AD 1290–1382)
 Chiefdom of Manyi (AD 1276–19th century) – 
 Chiefdom of Malong Prefecture (AD 1276–?) – 
 Mengzi County Tuxiancheng (AD 1276–?) – 
 Chiefdom of Tong'an Prefecture (AD 1277–?) – 
 Chuxiong Tuxunjian (AD 13th century–?) – 
 Chiefdom of Rongmei (AD 1310–1735) – 
 Chiefdom of Shunning Prefecture (AD 1327–?) – 
 Three Great Principalities under the Yuan dynasty (?–AD 1332) – 
 Principality of Beiping (?–AD 1282)
 Principality of Yan (AD 1262–1331)
 Principality of Anxi (AD 1272–1332)
 Chiefdom of Jindong (AD 1346–1735) – 
 Tianwan (AD 1351–1360) – 
 Chiefdom of Zhongxiao (AD 1351–1734) – 
 Zhang Zhou (AD 1354–1367) – 
 Phagmodrupa dynasty (AD 1354–1618) – 
 Han Song (AD 1355–1366) – 
 Chiefdom of Tangya (AD 1355–1735) – 
 Chen Han (AD 1360–1364) – 
 Ming Xia (AD 1363–1371) – 
 Chiefdom of Maogang (AD 1364–20th century) – 
 Ming dynasty (AD 1368–1644) – 
 Western Wu (AD 1364–1368)
 Southern Ming (AD 1644–1662)
 Chiefdom of Tianping (AD 1369–1735) – 
 Chiefdom of Zhonglu (AD 1371–1390, AD 1407–1735) – 
 Xundian Tuzhifu (AD 1372–?)
 Chiefdom of Biligongwa (AD 1373–?)
 Chiefdom of Baojing Prefecture (AD 1374–1729) – 
 Chiefdom of Duogandan (AD 1374–?)
 Chiefdom of Duogancangtang (AD 1374–?)
 Duogansi Xuanweishisi (AD 1374–?)
 Duogansi Zhaotaosi (AD 1374–?)
 Duogansi Qianhusuo (AD 1374–?)
 Chiefdom of Duoganchuan (AD 1374–?)
 Chiefdom of Duoganlongda (AD 1374–?)
 Chiefdom of Mo'erkan (AD 1374–?)
 Chiefdom of Dasima (AD 1374–?)
 Chiefdom of Changhexi (AD 1374–?)
 Chiefdom of Sha'erke (AD 1375–?)
 Chiefdom of Naizhu (AD 1375–?)
 Chiefdom of Luosiduan (AD 1375–?)
 Chiefdom of Elisi (AD 1375–?)
 Chiefdom of Dalong (AD 1375–?)
 Kara Del (AD 1380–1513) – 
 Kingdom of Mustang (AD 1380–2008)
 Chiefdom of Yongning (AD 1381–1956) – 
 Chiefdom of Baishuiguan (AD 1381–?) – 
 Chiefdom of Anning Prefecture (AD 1381–?) – 
 Chiefdom of Nan'an Prefecture (AD 1381–?) – 
 Chiefdom of Lubiao (AD 1381–?) – 
 Chiefdom of Jinshajiang (AD 1381–?) – 
 Lijiang Tuzhifu (AD 1382–1723) – 
 Chiefdom of Situodian (AD 1382–1912)
 Chiefdom of Lujiang (AD 1382–1956) – 
 Chiefdom of Mengding (AD 1382–?) – 
 Chiefdom of Yangsiduo (AD 1382–?)
 Chiefdom of Shaqiaoyi (AD 1382–?) – 
 Chiefdom of Chengjiang Prefecture (AD 1382–?) – 
 Chiefdom of Lunan Prefecture (AD 1382–?) – 
 Chiefdom of Guangnan Prefecture (AD 1382–?) – 
 Chiefdom of Luoxiong Prefecture (AD 1382–?) – 
 Chiefdom of Qujing Prefecture (AD 1382–?) – 
 Chiefdom of Guanjianshan (AD 1382–?) – 
 Chiefdom of Xuanhuaguan (AD 1382–?) – 
 Chiefdom of Mishajing (AD 1382–?) – 
 Chiefdom of Guanyinshanyi (AD 1382–?) – 
 Chiefdom of Yimen County (AD 1382–?) – 
 Chiefdom of Dengchuan Prefecture (AD 1382–?) – 
 Chiefdom of Dali Prefecture (AD 1382–?) – 
 Chiefdom of Caojian (AD 1382–?) – 
 Chiefdom of Qingsuobi (AD 1382–?) – 
 Chiefdom of Annanpo (AD 1382–?) – 
 Chiefdom of Fengyuxiang (AD 1382–?) – 
 Chiefdom of Upper Jiangzui (AD 1382–?) – 
 Chiefdom of Shijing (AD 1382–?) – 
 Chiefdom of Shenmodong (AD 1382–?) – 
 Chiefdom of Shundangjing (AD 1382–?) – 
 Chiefdom of Shundangyanjing (AD 1382–?) – 
 Chiefdom of Langqiong County (AD 1382–?) – 
 Chiefdom of Deshengguanyi (AD 1382–?) – 
 Chiefdom of Yunnanyi (AD 1382–?) – 
 Chiefdom of Erxiyi (AD 1382–?) – 
 Chiefdom of Guangtong (AD 1382–?) – 
 Chiefdom of Nalouchadian (AD 1382–?) – 
 Chiefdom of Kuirongdian (AD 1382–?) – 
 Chiefdom of Entuodian (AD 1382–?) – 
 Chiefdom of Xichudian (AD 1382–?) – 
 Chiefdom of Yingwuguan (AD 1382–?) – 
 Chiefdom of Zhennanguan (AD 1382–?) – 
 Chiefdom of Shayi (AD 1382–?) – 
 Chiefdom of Wazha (AD 1382–?) – 
 Heqing Tutongzhi (AD 1382–?) – 
 Heqing Tuzhishi (AD 1382–?) – 
 Huidengguan Tuxunjian (AD 1382–?) – 
 Huidengguan Tuxunjian (AD 1382–?) – 
 Chuxiong County Tuxiancheng (AD 1382–?) – 
 Dingyuan County Tuzhubu (AD 1382–?) – 
 Xi'e County Tuzhixian (AD 1382–?) – 
 Heqing Prefecture Tuyicheng (AD 1382–?) – 
 Zhennan Prefecture Tupanguan (AD 1382–?) – 
 Baoshan Prefecture Tuzhizhou (AD 1382–?) – 
 Shi'erguan Tuxunjian (AD 1382–?) – 
 Shi'erguan Tuxunjian (AD 1382–?) – 
 Chuxiong Prefecture Tuzhifu (AD 1382–?) – 
 Chiefdom of Na-shi (AD 1383–20th century) – 
 Dahou Prefecture Tuxunjian (AD 1383–?) – 
 Chiefdom of Axiongguan (AD 1383–?) – 
 Chiefdom of Puchang (AD 1383–?) – 
 Chiefdom of Luliang Prefecture (AD 1383–?) – 
 Chiefdom of Yilongyi (AD 1383–?) – 
 Chiefdom of Lower Jiangzui (AD 1383–?) – 
 Chiefdom of Jianganchang (AD 1383–?) – 
 Chiefdom of Manshenzhai (AD 1383–?) – 
 Chiefdom of Shanjingyanjing (AD 1383–?) – 
 Chiefdom of Jujin Prefecture (AD 1383–?) – 
 Chiefdom of Ami Prefecture (AD 1383–?) – 
 Chiefdom of Mishayanjing (AD 1383–?) – 
 Chiefdom of Lianxiangguan (AD 1383–?) – 
 Chiefdom of Nanpingguan (AD 1383–?) – 
 Chiefdom of Yunlong Prefecture (AD 1383–?) – 
 Chiefdom of Pindian (AD 1383–?) – 
 Chiefdom of Nidian (AD 1383–?) – 
 Chiefdom of Putuokong (AD 1383–?) – 
 Chiefdom of Yaozhou (AD 1383–?) – 
 Lanzhou Tuzhizhou (AD 1383–?) – 
 Shimenguan Tuxunjian (AD 1383–?) – 
 Chuxiong Tuxunjian (AD 1383–?) – 
 Yunnan County Tuxiancheng (AD 1383–?) – 
 Zhennan Prefecture Tutongzhi (AD 1383–?) – 
 Chiefdom of Malongtalangdian (AD 1384–1501) – 
 Chiefdom of Dingxiling (AD 1384–?) – 
 Heqing Tuzhifu (AD 1384–?) – 
 Chuxiong County Tuzhubu (AD 1384–?) – 
 Yunnan County Tuzhubu (AD 1384–?) – 
 Chiefdom of Gelatang (AD 1385–?)
 Chiefdom of Shalu (AD 1385–?)
 Chiefdom of Chishuipeng (AD 1385–?) – 
 Jianchuan Prefecture Tuzhizhou (AD 1386–?) – 
 Chiefdom of Abangxiang (AD 1387–?) – 
 Chiefdom of Nandian (AD 1389–1950) – 
 Shimenguan Tuqianfuzhang (AD 1391–?) – 
 Chiefdom of Lianxiangguan (AD 1393–?) – 
 Chiefdom of Pingyi County (AD 1394–?) – 
 Mengzi County Tuzhixian (AD 1394–?) – 
 Chiefdom of Yuezhou (AD 1395–?) – 
 Chiefdom of Gengma (AD 1397–1950) – 
 Chiefdom of Dongxiangwulu (AD 14th century–1732) – 
 Möng Lem (AD 14th century–19th century)
 Chiefdom of A (AD 14th century–1931) – 
 Hor States (AD 14th century–20th century)
 Khangsar (?–?)
 Mazur (?–?)
 Drango (?–?)
 Beri (?–?)
 Trehor (?–?)
 Chiefdom of Longdawei (AD 14th century–?)
 Möng Yang (AD 14th century–19th century)
 Chiefdom of Fuzhou (AD 14th century–?) – 
 Chiefdom of Luokongdian (AD 14th century–?) – 
 Chiefdom of Zuonengzhai (AD 14th century–?) – 
 Shi'erguan Tufuzhangguan (AD 14th century–?) – 
 Jianchuan Prefecture Tuqianhu (AD 14th century–?) – 
 Chiefdom of Luoci County (AD 1400–?) – 
 Chiefdom of Qingshuijiang (AD 1404–?) – 
 Yizuo County Tubashi (AD 1405–?) – 
 Hulun (AD 1406–1619) – 
 Ula (AD 1561–1613) – 
 Hoifa (AD 16th century–1607) – 
 Hada (AD 16th century–17th century) – 
 Yehe (?–AD 1619) – 
 Beile of Western City of Yehe (?–AD 1619)
 Beile of Eastern City of Yehe (?–AD 1619)
 Chiefdom of Lahezhuang (AD 1406–?)
 Chiefdom of Lima (AD 1408–?)
 Chiefdom of Zhuoyou (AD 1409–?)
 Chiefdom of Dongbuhanhu (AD 1415–?)
 Chiefdom of Moshale (AD 1416–1665) – 
 Chiefdom of Zhuoni (AD 1418–1949) – 
 Chiefdom of Hemocun (AD 1424–?) – 
 Yizuo County Tuxiancheng (AD 1427–?) – 
 Xi'e County Tuzhubu (AD 1428–?) – 
 Chiefdom of Songshaopu (AD 1434–?) – 
 Rinpungpa (AD 1435–1565) – 
 Dahou Prefecture Tuzhizhou (AD 1438–?) – 
 Chiefdom of Guansuoling (AD 1439–?) – 
 Chiefdom of Qujing (AD 1441–?) – 
 Lijiang Tuzhaomo (AD 1441–?) – 
 Chiefdom of Jinningyi (AD 1442–?) – 
 Chiefdom of Mangshi (AD 1443–1955) – 
 Chiefdom of Tieluguan (AD 1443–?) – 
 Chiefdom of Sinangri (AD 1446–?)
 Namgyal dynasty of Ladakh (AD 1460–1842) – 
 Chiefdom of Dongshankou (AD 1464–?) – 
 Chiefdom of Nagengshan (AD 1482–?) – 
 Chiefdom of Yongshun (AD 1492–1928) – 
 Kingdom of Derge (AD 15th century–1956) – 
 Chiefdom of Tangchi (AD 15th century–?) – 
 Tsangpa (AD 1565–1642)
 Chiefdom of Qieluoguan (AD 1591–?) – 
 Chiefdom of Mengmian (AD 1593–?) – 
 Chiefdom of Damengma (AD 1594–?) – 
 Chiefdom of Mengmeng (AD 1599–?) – 
 Chiefdom of Zhefang (AD 16th century–1955) – 
 Chiefdom of Menghan (AD 1606–1950) – 
 Chiefdom of Mengmao (AD 1611–1955) – 
 Chiefdom of Zhanyi Prefecture (AD 1623–?) – 
 Chiefdom of Douyanzhai (AD 1632–?) – 
 Oirat state (?–AD 1634) – 
 Dzungar Khanate (AD 1634–1757)
 Qing dynasty (AD 1636–1912, AD 1917) – 
 Later Jin (AD 1616–1636)
 Chiefdom of Atuzhai (AD 1637–?) – 
 Chiefdom of Shuitangzhai (AD 1639–?) – 
 Chiefdom of Mengsuozhai (AD 1640–1954) – 
 Khoshut Khanate (AD 1642–1717) – 
 Xi (AD 1643–1647) – 
 Shun dynasty (AD 1644–1646) – 
 Chiefdom of Muli (AD 1648–1952) – 
 Chiefdom of Menglazhai (AD 1658–?) – 
 Chiefdom of Wumuzhai (AD 1658–?) – 
 Chiefdom of Wubangzhai (AD 1658–?) – 
 Kingdom of Tungning (AD 1661–1683) – 
 Chiefdom of Ami Prefecture (AD 1665–?) – 
 Yizuo County Tuzhixian (AD 1669–?) – 
 Wu Zhou (AD 1678–1681) – 
 Chiefdom of Xinxing Prefecture (AD 1680–?) – 
 Ningzhou Tuzhoupan (AD 1680–?) – 
 Chiefdom of Zhemizhai (AD 1682–?) – 
 Chiefdom of Mengdingzhai (AD 1694–?) – 
 Lanzhou Tushe (AD 1694–?) – 
 Kumul Khanate (AD 1696–1930) – 
 Chiefdom of Shaxi (AD 17th century–1735) – 
 Seqalu (AD 17th century–1904) – 
 Chiefdom of Bathang (AD 1719–1906)
 Chiefdom of Lithang (AD 1719–1906)
 Chiefdom of Mengbangzhai (AD 1726–?) – 
 Chiefdom of Menglaizhai (AD 1726–?) – 
 Chiefdom of Sangzhi (?–AD 1727) – 
 Kingdom of Middag (?–AD 1732) – 
 Chiefdom of Youyang (?–AD 1734) – 
 Chiefdom of Shinan (?–AD 1734) – 
 Chiefdom of Mengnongzhai (AD 1735–?) – 
 Chiefdom of Yanwang (AD 1738–?) – 
 Chiefdom of Kokang (AD 1739–1959) – 
 Chiefdom of Lancangjiang (AD 1742–?) – 
 Chiefdom of Guihualilaowo (AD 1747–?) – 
 Chiefdom of Liuku (AD 1747–?) – 
 Chiefdom of Citongbazhai (AD 1753–?) – 
 Chiefdom of Malongzhai (AD 1755–?) – 
 Dörbet tribe of Choros (AD 1756–1923) – 
 Chiefdom of Shizhu (?–AD 1761) – 
 Heqing Prefecture Tutongpan (AD 1770–?) – 
 Chiefdom of Mengjiaodong (AD 1771–1949) – 
 Old Torghut tribe (AD 1771–1949)
 Chiefdom of Gaowuka (AD 1785–?) – 
 Chiefdom of Adunzi (AD 1802–?) – 
 Kavalan (?–AD 1812)
 Taiping Heavenly Kingdom (AD 1851–1864) – 
 Chiefdom of Nixi (?–AD 1853) – 
 Cheng (AD 1855–1864) – 
 Pingnan (AD 1856–1873) – 
 Ili Sultanate (AD 1864–1871)
 Yettishar Khanate (AD 1865–1867)
 Hongfu Khanate (AD 1867–1877)
 Chiefdom of Muchuan (?–AD 1868) – 
 Chiefdom of Mengbin (AD 1891–?) – 
 Chiefdom of Jiufang (AD 1891–?) – 
 Chiefdom of Banzhong (AD 1891–?) – 
 Chiefdom of Jianguan (AD 1891–?) – 
 Chiefdom of Manhai (AD 1891–?) – 
 Chiefdom of Upper Mengyun (AD 1891–?) – 
 Chiefdom of Lower Mengyun (AD 1891–?) – 
 Chiefdom of Munai (AD 1891–?) – 
 Chiefdom of Donghe (AD 1891–?) – 
 Chiefdom of Ximingzhao (AD 1891–?) – 
 Pimaba (?–AD 1897)
 Chiefdom of Mengban (AD 1899–1955) – 
 Bogd Khanate (AD 1911–1919, AD 1921–1924)
 Chiefdom of Yutong (?–AD 1911) – 
 Chiefdom of Geshizha (?–AD 1911)
 Empire of China (AD 1915–1916) – 
 Kingdom of Powo (?–AD 1910, AD 1911–1928)
 Tjaquvuquvulj (?–AD 1930)
 Manchukuo (AD 1934–1945) – 
 Chiefdom of Ganya (?–AD 1949) – 
 Chiefdom of Menghai (?–AD 1950) – 
 Thirty-six States of the Western Regions (?–?)
 Shule (200 BC–AD 790)
 Loulan (176–77 BC)
 Shanshan (77 BC–AD 630)
 Kucha (72 BC–AD 788)
 Jushi (71 BC–AD 508)
 Nearer Jushi (71 BC–AD 508)
 Further Jushi (67 BC–AD 170)
 Suoju (66 BC–AD 89)
 Khotan (AD 56–1006) – 
 Yanqi (AD 58–792) – 
 Ruoqiang (?–?)
 Qiemo (?–?)
 Xiaoyuan (?–?)
 Jingjue (?–?)
 Ronglu (?–?)
 Hanmi (?–?)
 Qule (?–?)
 Pishan (?–?)
 Wucha (?–?)
 Yinai (?–?)
 Xiye (?–?)
 Zihe (?–?)
 Puli (?–?)
 Nandou (?–?)
 Taohuai (?–?)
 Juandu (?–?)
 Gumo (?–?)
 Wensu (?–?)
 Quli (?–?)
 Wulei (?–?)
 Weili (?–?)
 Weixu (?–?)
 Beilu (?–?)
 Further Beilu (?–?)
 Jie (?–?)
 Pulei (?–?)
 Nearer Pulei (?–?)
 Further Pulei (?–?)
 Qiemi (?–?)
 Eastern Qiemi (?–?)
 Western Qiemi (?–?)
 Shan (?–?)
 Huhu (?–?)
 Wulei (?–?)
 Weitou (?–?)
 Xiuxun (?–?)
 Eighteen Chiefdoms of Gyalrong (?–?)
 Chiefdom of Shenbian (AD 1369–1911) – 
 Chiefdom of Muping (AD 1373–1928)
 Chiefdom of Chakla (AD 1407–1911) – 
 Chiefdom of Zagu (AD 1410–1752)
 Chiefdom of Suomo (AD 1721–1938)
 Chiefdom of Songgang (AD 1753–1928)
 Chiefdom of Lengbian (AD 1410–1911) – 
 Chiefdom of Wasi (AD 1441–1935) – 
 Chiefdom of Tsanlha (AD 1650–1776)
 Chiefdom of Wori (AD 1658–?)
 Chiefdom of Chuosijia (AD 1702–?)
 Chiefdom of Chuchen (AD 1723–1776)
 Chiefdom of Dangba (AD 1753–1953)
 Chiefdom of Zhuokeji (AD 1753–?)
 Chiefdom of Bawang (AD 1774–?)
 Chiefdom of Badi (AD 1774–?)
 Chiefdom of Tianquan (?–AD 18th century)
 Chiefdom of Dandong (?–?)
 Fu (?–?)
 Hua (?–?)
 Baizi (?–?) – 
 Jianning (?–?) – 
 Yuezhi (?–?)
 Greater Yuezhi (?–?)
 Lesser Yuezhi (?–?)
 Wuhuan (?–?)
 Wuwan (?–?)
 Dianyue (?–?)
 Fulou (?–?)
 Yulishi (?–?)
 Danhuan (?–?)
 Wutanzili (?–?)
 Congling Uyghur Kingdom (?–?)
 Sabetiq (?–?)
 Lalekelek (?–?)
 Kuvalen (?–?) – 
 Draki (?–?)
 Auran (?–?)
 Kulon (?–?)
 Favorlang (?–?)
 Tiksam (?–?)
 Kibuwan (?–?)
 Tamsui (?–?)
 Jilong (?–?)
 Liuqiu (?–?) – 
 Hujie (?–?)
 Jiankun (?–?)
 Luodian (?–?)
 Eastern Xieman (?–?) – 
 Western Xieman (?–?) – 
 Southern Xieman (?–?) – 
 Western Zhaoman (?–?) – 
 Yizi (?–?) – 
 Xunyu (?–?) – 
 Dugu tribe (?–?) – 
 Murong tribe (?–?) – 
 Helan tribe (?–?) – 
 Boma (?–?)
 Tongluo tribe (?–?)
 Dörbet tribe of Borjigin (?–?) – 
 Chuxiong County Tutongshi (?–?) – 
 Chuxiong County Tutongba (?–?) – 
 Chuxiong County Tubashi (?–?) – 
 Chuxiong County Tuxunjian (?–?) – 
 Heqing Prefecture Tuqianfuzhang (?–?) – 
 Heqing Tujingli (?–?) – 
 Xundian Tuqianfuzhang (?–?) – 
 Yao'an Prefecture Tuzhaomo (?–?) – 
 Dingyuan County Tubashi (?–?) – 
 Chiefdom of Dingbian County (?–?) – 
 Chiefdom of Geni (?–?)
 Chiefdom of Suweiyi (?–?)
 Chiefdom of Youdian (?–?) – 
 Chiefdom of Laowo (?–?) – 
 Chiefdom of Lesser Gaur (?–?) – 
 Chiefdom of Mubang (?–?)
 Chiefdom of Nalouchongdaoanzheng'erli (?–?) – 
 Chiefdom of Liuhuzhangzhai (?–?) – 
 Chiefdom of Shanghekuirong (?–?) – 
 Chiefdom of Béri (?–?)
 Chiefdom of Canbulang (?–?)
 Chiefdom of Shuijijiang (?–?)
 Chiefdom of Shuidejiang (AD 14th century–1605)
 Chiefdom of Yidu (?–?) – 
 Chiefdom of Pingyi (?–?) – 
 Chiefdom of Leipo (?–?) – 
 Chiefdom of Guizhou (?–?)
 Chiefdom of Zhengmai (?–?)
 Chiefdom of Mengliang (?–?)
 Chiefdom of Menghai (?–?) – 
 Chiefdom of Mengyuan (?–?) – 
 Chiefdom of Meng'a (?–?) – 
 Chiefdom of Mengla (?–?)
 Chiefdom of Mengwang (?–?) – 
 Chiefdom of Menghun (?–?) – 
 Chiefdom of Mengzhe (?–?)
 Chiefdom of Menglong (?–?) – 
 Chiefdom of Mengla (?–?)
 Chiefdom of Mengyong (?–?)
 Chiefdom of Mengsan (?–?)
 Chiefdom of Mengyu (?–?)
 Chiefdom of Mengwang (?–?)
 Chiefdom of Weiyuan (?–?) – 
 Chiefdom of Yongle (?–?) – 
 Chiefdom of Liucun (?–?) – 
 Chiefdom of Zongwa (?–?) – 
 Chiefdom of Zongha (?–?) – 
 Chiefdom of Ganlanba (?–?)
 Chiefdom of Yiwu (?–?)
 Chiefdom of Liushun (?–?)
 Chiefdom of Buha (?–?)
 Chiefdom of Jinghai (?–?)
 Chiefdom of Jingxian (?–?)
 Chiefdom of Manmu (?–?)
 Chiefdom of Dashan (?–?)
 Chiefdom of Puteng (?–?)
 Chiefdom of Zhengdong (?–?)
 Chiefdom of Dongwu (?–?)
 Chiefdom of Wude (?–?)
 Chiefdom of Zhanda (?–?)
 Chiefdom of Longchuan (?–?)
 Chiefdom of Husa (?–?)
 Chiefdom of Lasa (?–?)
 Chiefdom of Na-shi of Wuding (?–?) – 
 Chiefdom of An-shi of Xuanwei (?–?) – 
 Chiefdom of Qiongbu (?–?) – 
 Chiefdom of Mengmeng (?–?) – 
 Chiefdom of Mengsa (?–?) – 
 Chiefdom of Alinzhai (?–?) – 
 Chiefdom of Mangshuizhai (?–?) – 
 Chiefdom of Banhong (?–?) – 
 Chiefdom of Malong Prefecture (?–?) – 
 Chiefdom of Luzhang (?–?) – 
 Chiefdom of Denggeng (?–?) – 
 Chiefdom of Maozhao (?–?) – 
 Chiefdom of Shangwujing (?–?) – 
 Chiefdom of Lazong (?–?)
 Chiefdom of Bolijia (?–?)
 Chiefdom of Duobasansun (?–?)
 Chiefdom of Jiaba (?–?)
 Chiefdom of Zhaori (?–?)
 Chiefdom of Nazhu (?–?)
 Chiefdom of Lunda (?–?)
 Chiefdom of Guoyou (?–?)
 Chiefdom of Shalikehahudi (?–?)
 Chiefdom of Salitu'er (?–?)
 Chiefdom of Lacuoya (?–?)
 Chiefdom of Runzelusun (?–?)
 Chiefdom of Bujiucun (?–?) – 
 Chiefdom of Manchexiang (?–?) –

Dynasties of foreign colonies and concessions in China

 House of Aviz (AD 1557–1580) – 
 House of Braganza (AD 1640–1853) – 
 House of Braganza-Saxe-Coburg and Gotha (AD 1853–1910) – 
 House of Habsburg (AD 1626–1642) – 
 Philippine dynasty (AD 1581–1640) – 
 House of Hanover (AD 1841–1901) – 
 House of Bonaparte (AD 1852–1870) – 
 House of Hohenzollern (AD 1895–1917) – 
 Imperial House of Japan (AD 1895–1945) – 
 House of Holstein-Gottorp-Romanov (AD 1896–1917) – 
 House of Saxe-Coburg and Gotha (AD 1901–1920) – 
 House of Windsor (AD 1917–1997) – 
 House of Belgium (AD 1920–1931) – 
 House of Savoy-Carignano (AD 1901–1943) – 
 House of Habsburg-Lorraine (AD 1902–1917) –

Cyprus
 Sargonid dynasty (709–627 BC) – 
 Dynasty XXVI of Egypt (570–525 BC) – 
 Achaemenid dynasty (525–332 BC)
 Argead dynasty (332–323 BC) – 
 Ptolemaic dynasty (323–58 BC)
 Julio–Claudian dynasty (27 BC–AD 68) – 
 Flavian dynasty (AD 68–96) – 
 Nerva–Antonine dynasty (AD 96–192) – 
 Severan dynasty (AD 193–235) – 
 Gordian dynasty (AD 238–244) – 
 Decian dynasty (AD 249–253) – 
 Valerian dynasty (AD 253–268) – 
 Illyrian emperors (AD 268–284) – 
 Caran dynasty (AD 282–285) – 
 Constantinian dynasty (AD 305–363) – 
 Valentinianic dynasty (AD 364–379) – 
 Theodosian dynasty (AD 379–457) – 
 Leonid dynasty (AD 457–518) – 
 Justinian dynasty (AD 518–602) – 
 Heraclian dynasty (AD 610–711) – 
 Umayyad dynasty (AD 688–750) – 
 Isaurian dynasty (AD 717–802) – 
 Abbasid Caliphate (AD 750–965) – 
 Nikephorian dynasty (AD 802–813) – 
 Amorian dynasty (AD 820–867) – 
 Macedonian dynasty (AD 867–1056) – 
 Doukid dynasty (AD 1059–1081) – 
 Komnenos dynasty (AD 1081–1191) – 
 House of Lusignan (AD 1191–1267) – 
 House of Poitiers-Lusignan (AD 1267–1489) – 
 Ottoman dynasty (AD 1571–1878)
 House of Hanover (AD 1878–1901) – 
 House of Saxe-Coburg and Gotha (AD 1901–1917) – 
  (AD 1917–present) –

Indian Subcontinent (South Asia)

Note that many dates before the 9th century AD are disputed.

 Solar dynasty – 
 Lunar dynasty – 
 Brihadratha dynasty (c. 1760–831 BC) – 
 Danava dynasty – 
 Kuru Kingdom (c. 1200–525 BC)
 Gonanditya dynasty (c. 1182–212 BC)
 Restored Gonanditya dynasty (AD 25–598)
 Panchala (c. 900–400 BC)
 Ikshvaku dynasty (c. 7th century–5th century BC) – 
 Baghochia dynasty (c. 6th century BC–AD 1947)
 Chedi Kingdom (c. 600–300 BC)
 Haryanka dynasty (c. 544–413 BC) – 
 Pradyota dynasty (c. 541–403 BC)
 Ror dynasty (450 BC–AD 489)
 Shaishunaga dynasty (c. 413–345 BC) – 
 Nanda Empire (c. 345–322 BC)
 Maurya Empire (c. 321–185 BC)
 Chola dynasty (c. 4th century BC–AD 1279)
 Later Chola dynasty (AD 1070–1279)
 Chera dynasty (c. 300 BC–AD 1124)
 Pandyan dynasty (c. 300 BC–AD 1650)
 Satavahana dynasty (c. 230 BC–AD 220)
 Shunga Empire (c. 185–75 BC)
 Mitra dynasty (c. 150–50 BC)
 Deva dynasty (2nd century–1st century BC)
 Mahameghavahana dynasty (2nd century BC–AD 4th century)
 Kanva dynasty (c. 73–28 BC)
 Northern Satraps (60 BC–AD 2nd century)
 Datta dynasty (1st century BC–AD 1st century)
 Kushan Empire (AD 30–375)
 Ningthouja dynasty (AD 33–1971)
 Western Satraps (AD 35–405)
 Nagvanshis of Chotanagpur (AD 83–1952)
 Alupa dynasty (AD 200–1444)
 Andhra Ikshvaku (c. AD 210–325)
 Sasanian dynasty (AD 224–651) – 
 Vakataka dynasty (AD 250–500)
 Pallava dynasty (AD 275–897)
 Nagas of Padmavati (AD 3rd century–4th century)
 Gupta Empire (AD 3rd century–543)
 Bhojas of Goa (AD 3rd century–6th century)
 Kidarites (AD 320–500)
 Kadamba dynasty (AD 345–540)
 Kadambas of Hangal (AD 980–14th century)
 Kadambas of Goa (AD 10th century–14th century)
 Kadambas of Halasi
 Western Ganga dynasty (AD 350–1000)
 Aulikaras (AD 350–550)
 Second Aulikara dynasty (AD 4th century–6th century) – 
 Varman dynasty (AD 350–655)
 Traikutaka dynasty (AD 388–456)
 Vishnukundina dynasty (AD 420–624)
 Rai dynasty (AD 489–632)
 Later Gupta dynasty (AD 490–750)
 Maitraka dynasty (AD 493–776)
 Uchchhakalpa dynasty (AD 5th century–6th century)
 Sharabhapuriya dynasty (AD 5th century–6th century)
 Pitrbhakta dynasty (AD 5th century–6th century)
 Parivrajaka dynasty (AD 5th century–6th century)
 Chalukya dynasty (AD 543–753)
 Western Chalukya Empire (AD 973–1189)
 Maukhari dynasty (AD 550–606)
 Gurjaras of Lata (AD 580–738)
 Gauda Kingdom (AD 590–626)
 Pushyabhuti dynasty (AD 6th century–7th century)
 Kalachuri dynasty (AD 6th century–7th century)
 Panduvamshis of Mekala (AD 6th century–7th century)
 Nala dynasty (AD 6th century–8th century)
 Shailodbhava dynasty (AD 6th century–8th century)
 Patola Shahis (AD 6th century–8th century)
 Pratiharas of Mandavyapura (AD 6th century–9th century)
 Chahamanas of Shakambhari (AD 6th century–12th century)
 Chahamanas of Naddula (AD 950–1197)
 Chahamanas of Jalor (AD 1160–1311)
 Telugu Cholas (AD 6th century–13th century)
 Velanati Chodas (AD 1076–1216)
 Renati Cholas
 Pottapi Cholas
 Konidena Cholas
 Nannuru Cholas
 Nidugal Cholas
 Nellore Chodas
 Kingdom of Cochin (AD 6th century–1949)
 Jethwa dynasty (AD 620–1948)
 Eastern Chalukyas (AD 624–1189)
 Khadga dynasty (AD 625–8th century)
 Karkota Empire (AD 625–885)
 Brahman dynasty of Sindh (AD 632–724)
 Mlechchha dynasty (AD 650–900)
 Gurjara-Pratihara dynasty (AD 650–1036)
 Jethwa dynasty (AD 690–1948)
 Panduvamshis of Dakshina Kosala (AD 7th century–8th century)
 Patola Shahi dynasty (AD 7th century–8th century)
 Kalachuris of Tripuri (AD 7th century–13th century)
 Katyuri kings (AD 700–1200)
 Chand kings (AD 700–1790)
 Saindhava (AD 735–920)
 Tomara dynasty (AD 736–1152)
 Pala Empire (AD 750–1174)
 Rashtrakuta dynasty (AD 753–982)
 Shilahara dynasty (AD 765–13th 1265)
 South Konkan branch (AD 765–1020)
 North Konkan branch (AD 800–1265)
 Kolhapur branch (AD 940–1212)
 Trakhan dynasty (AD 780–1821)
 Bhauma-Kara dynasty (AD 8th century–10th century)
 Kongu Chera dynasty (AD 845–1150)
 Hindu Shahi (AD 850–1026)
 Habbari dynasty (AD 854–1011)
 Utpala dynasty (AD 855–1003)
 Seuna dynasty (AD 860–1317)
 Ghurid dynasty (AD 879–1215)
 Ma'danids (AD 9th century–11th century)
 Paramara dynasty (AD 9th century–1305)
 Perumal dynasty of Kerala (AD 9th century–12th century)
 Chandelas of Jejakabhukti (AD 9th century–13th century)
 Chudasama dynasty (AD 9th century–1472)
 Chandra dynasty (AD 900–1050)
 Pala dynasty (AD 900–1100)
 Pandalam dynasty (AD 903–1820)
 Chaulukya dynasty (AD 940–1244)
 Chalukyas of Lata (AD 970–1070)
 Lodi dynasty of Multan (AD 970s–1010) – 
 Ghaznavid dynasty (AD 977–1186)
 Kamboja Pala dynasty (AD 10th century–11th century)
 Barha dynasty (AD 10th century–20th century)
 Rohilla dynasty (AD 1721–1947)
 Lohara dynasty (AD 1003–1320)
 Hoysala Empire (AD 1026–1343)
 Soomra dynasty (AD 1026–1356)
 Sena dynasty (AD 1070–1230)
 Eastern Ganga dynasty (AD 1078–1434)
 Gahadavala dynasty (AD 1089–1197)
 Karnat dynasty (AD 1097–1324)
 Kalachuris of Ratnapura (AD 11th century–13th century)
 Pithipatis of Bodh Gaya (AD 11th century–13th century)
 Khasa-Malla Kingdom (AD 11th century–14th century)
 Kota Vamsa (AD 1108–1268)
 Zamorin of Calicut (AD 1124–1806)
 Kalachuris of Kalyani (AD 1156–1181)
 Poonjar dynasty (AD 1160–1947)
 Kakatiya dynasty (AD 1163–1323)
 Kalachuris of Kalyani (AD 1164–1181)
 Chutiya Kingdom (AD 1187–1673)
 Maqpon dynasty (AD 1190–1840)
 Deva dynasty (AD 12th century–13th century)
 Chowta dynasty (AD 12th century–18th century)
 Chero dynasty (AD 12th century–19th century)
 Mamluk dynasty (AD 1206–1290) – 
 Kadava dynasty (AD 1216–1279)
 Ahom dynasty (AD 1228–1826) – 
 Vaghela dynasty (AD 1244–1304)
 Manikya dynasty (AD 1280–1947)
 Khalji dynasty (AD 1290–1320) – 
 Yajvapala dynasty (?–AD 1298)
 Musunuri Nayakas (AD 13th century–14th century)
 Dimasa Kingdom (AD 13th century-1832)
 Mukne dynasty (AD 1306–1947)
 Tughlaq dynasty (AD 1320–1413) – 
 Reddi Kingdom (AD 1325–1448)
 Oiniwar dynasty (AD 1325–1526)
 Sisodia (AD 1326–1955)
 Musunuri Nayakas (AD 1335–1368)
 Ma'bar Sultanate (AD 1335–1378)
 Sangama dynasty (AD 1336–1487) – 
 Shah Mir dynasty (AD 1339–1561)
 Ilyas Shahi dynasty (AD 1342–1414, AD 1435–1487) – 
 Bahmani Sultanate (AD 1347–1527)
 Samma dynasty (AD 1351–1524)
 Timurid dynasty (AD 1370–1507) – 
 Mughal dynasty (AD 1526–1540, AD 1555–1857) – 
 Tomaras of Gwalior (AD 1375–1523)
 Farooqui dynasty (AD 1382–1601)
 Muzaffarid dynasty (AD 1391–1535, AD 1536–1573, AD 1583) – 
 Malwa Sultanate (AD 1392–1562)
 Wadiyar dynasty (AD 1399–1950) – 
 Tomaras of Gwalior (AD 14th century–16th century)
 Narajole Raj (AD 1400–1947)
 Manikya dynasty (AD 1400–1949)
 Kallala dynasty (AD 1404–1789)
 Ganesha dynasty (AD 1414–1435) – 
 Sayyid dynasty (AD 1414–1451) – 
 Pemmasani Nayaks (AD 1423–1685)
 Gajapati Empire (AD 1434–1541)
 Khen dynasty (AD 1440–1498)
 Lodi dynasty (AD 1451–1526) – 
 Namgyal dynasty (AD 1470–1975)
 Namgyal dynasty of Ladakh (AD 1470–1842)
 Namgyal dynasty of Sikkim (AD 1642–1975)
 Saluva dynasty (AD 1485–1505) – 
 Habshi dynasty (AD 1487–1494) – 
 Barid Shahi dynasty (AD 1489–1619) – 
 Pratapgarh Kingdom (AD 1489–18th century)
 Imad Shahi dynasty (AD 1490–1572) – 
 Nizam Shahi dynasty (AD 1490–1636) – 
 Adil Shahi dynasty (AD 1490–1686) – 
 Tuluva dynasty (AD 1491–1570) – 
 Hussain Shahi dynasty (AD 1494–1538) – 
 Nayakas of Keladi (AD 1499–1763)
 Thondaiman dynasty of Aranthangi (AD 15th century–18th century)
 Koch dynasty (AD 1515–1949)
 Qutb Shahi dynasty (AD 1518–1687) – 
 Arghun dynasty (AD 1520–1554)
 Tarkhan dynasty (AD 1554–1591)
 Madurai Nayak dynasty (AD 1529–1736)
 Sur Empire (AD 1538–1556) – 
 Thanjavur Nayak dynasty (AD 1532–1673)
 Aravidu dynasty (AD 1542–1646) – 
 Muhammad Shah dynasty (AD 1554–1564) – 
 Raj Darbhanga (AD 1557–1947)
 Karrani dynasty (AD 1564–1612) – 
 Katoor dynasty (AD 1570–1947)
 Nayakas of Chitradurga (AD 1588–1779)
 Bhonsle dynasty (AD 1645–1947)
 House of Satara (AD 1708–1839)
 House of Kolhapur (AD 1708–1946)
 House of Nagpur (AD 1738–1853)
 House of Thanjavur (?–AD 1855)
 Babi dynasty (AD 1654–1947)
 Pudukkottai dynasty (AD 1680–1948)
 Thondaiman dynasty of Pudukottai (AD 1686–1948)
 Kalhora dynasty (AD 1701–1783)
 Gaekwad dynasty (AD 1721–1947)
 Asaf Jahi dynasty (AD 1724–1948)
 Travancore royal family (AD 1729–1949) – 
 Nawab of Junagarh (AD 1730–1948)
 Holkar dynasty (AD 1731–1948)
 Scindia dynasty (AD 1731–1971)
 Nawab of Awadh (AD 1732–1818)
 Patwardhan dynasty (AD 1733–1948)
 Durrani dynasty (AD 1747–1826)
 Phulkian dynasty (AD 1763–1948)
 Newalkar dynasty (AD 1769–1858)
 Narayan dynasty (AD 1770–1948)
 Mong Circle (AD 1782–1964)
 Talpur dynasty (AD 1783–1843)
 Sikh Empire (AD 1799–1849)
 Guhila dynasty
 Rawal branch
 Rana branch
 Gohil dynasty
 Trakhàn dynasty (?–AD 1810)
 Dogra dynasty (AD 1846–1952)
 Bohmong Circle (?–AD 1964)
 Chakma Circle (?–AD 1964)
 Vidarbha Kingdom
 Bhanj dynasty
 Nolamba dynasty
 Bana Kingdom

Foreign dynasties on the Indian Subcontinent (South Asia)

 House of Aviz (AD 1505–1580) – 
 House of Aviz-Beja (AD 1505–1580) – 
 House of Braganza (AD 1640–1910) – 
 House of Braganza-Saxe-Coburg and Gotha (AD 1853–1910) – 
 Philippine dynasty (AD 1581–1640) – 
 House of Oldenburg (AD 1620–1863) – 
 House of Schleswig-Holstein-Sonderburg-Glücksburg (AD 1863–1869) – 
 House of Bourbon (AD 1664–1792, AD 1793–1795, AD 1814–1848) – 
 House of Bourbon-Vendôme (AD 1664–1792, AD 1814–1830) – 
 House of Orléans (AD 1830–1848) – 
 House of Habsburg (AD 1778–1780) – 
 House of Habsburg-Lorraine (AD 1780–1785) – 
 House of Bonaparte (AD 1804–1814, AD 1815, AD 1852–1870) – 
 House of Hanover (AD 1858–1901) – 
 House of Saxe-Coburg and Gotha (AD 1901–1917) – 
 House of Windsor (AD 1917–1956) – 
 Imperial House of Japan (AD 1942–1945) –

Indonesia

 Shailendra dynasty, Mataram Kingdom and Srivijaya
 Sanjaya dynasty, Mataram kingdom (Central Java period)
 Ishana dynasty, Mataram kingdom (East Java period), Kahuripan kingdom, Janggala and Kediri kingdom
 Mauli dynasty (1183–?), Dharmasraya and Pagaruyung kingdoms
 Rajasa dynasty, Singhasari kingdom (1222–1292) and Majapahit empire (1293 – ca. 1500)
 Ambeno
 Azmatkhan
 Kingdom of Iha
 Luwu
 Warmadewa dynasty (914–1119)
 Jaya dynasty (1133–1343)
 Rajasa dynasty (1222–1292, 1294–1527)
 Samudera Pasai Sultanate (1267–1521)
 Demak Sultanate (1475–1554)
 Sultanate of Cirebon (1479–1926)
 Aceh Sultanate (1496–1903)
 Jamal ul-Lail dynasty (1699–1727)
 Bugis dynasty (1727–1903)
 Malacca-Johor dynasty (1528–1699)
 Tanette (1547–?)
 House of Mataram ruling the Mataram Sultanate ((1570s (?))–1749/55) – Four successor dynasties:
 Surakarta Sunanate (Pakubuwono) a junior branch of the House of Mataram (1755–1946) – 
  a junior branch of the House of Mataram (1755–present) – 
  a junior branch of the House of Mataram (1757–present) – 
  a junior branch of the House of Mataram (1813–present) – 
 Sultanate of Sambas (1609–1956)
 Asahan Sultanate (1630–1946)
 Sultanate of Deli (1632–1946)
 Bone state (1634–1905, 1931–1950)
 Amanatun (1642–1962)
 Amabi (1652–1917)
 Bendahara dynasty (1699–1911)
 Amarasi (?–1962)
 Sultanate of Siak Sri Indrapura (1723–1946)
 Sultanate of Serdang (1728–?)
 House of Hanover (1785–1824) – 
 House of Bonaparte (1806–1811) – 
 House of Orange-Nassau (1816–1942, 1945–1949) – 
 Imperial House of Japan (1942–1945) –

Iran (Persia)

 Pishdadian dynasty – 
 Kayanian dynasty – 
 Awan dynasty (2350–2150 BC)
 Shimashki dynasty (2200–1900 BC)
 Sukkalmah dynasty (1900–1500 BC)
 Achaemenid dynasty (c. 730–330 BC) – 
 Teispids (675–522 BC) – 
 Median dynasty (678–549 BC) – 
 Argead dynasty (336–306 BC) – 
 Seleucid dynasty (312–63 BC) – 
 Arsacid dynasty (247 BC–AD 224) – 
 Kamnaskirid dynasty (147 BC–AD 25)
 Sasanian dynasty (AD 224–590, AD 591–651)
 Dabuyid dynasty (AD 642–760)
 Paduspanid dynasty (AD 655–1598)
 Bavand dynasty (AD 651–1349)
 Qarinvand dynasty (AD 550s–11th century) – 
 House of Mihran (AD 590–591, AD 629) – 
 House of Ispahbudhan (AD 591–596, AD 630–631) – 
 Zarmihrids (AD 6th century–785) – 
 Masmughans of Damavand (AD 651–760) – 
 Umayyad dynasty (AD 661–750) – 
 Abbasid dynasty (AD 750–946) – 
 Sadakiyans (AD 770–828) – 
 Justanid dynasty (AD 791–11th century)
 Dulafid dynasty (AD 800–897) – 
 Samanid dynasty (AD 819–999) – 
 Tahirid dynasty (AD 821–873) – 
 Saffarid dynasty (AD 861–913, AD 923–1003) – 
 House of Ali (AD 864–900, AD 914–928) – 
 Hasanids
 Husaynids
 Ghurid dynasty (AD 879–1215) – 
 Sajid dynasty (AD 889–929) – 
 Ma'danid dynasty (AD 9th century–11th century)
 Sallarid dynasty (AD 919–1062) – 
 Ziyarid dynasty (AD 930–1090) – 
 Banu Ilyas (AD 932–968) – 
 Buyid dynasty (AD 934–1062) – 
 Buyids of Fars (AD 933–1062)
 Buyids of Ray, Isfahan, and Hamadan (AD 935–1038)
 Buyids of Iraq and Khuzistan (AD 945–1055)
 Hasanwayhid dynasty (AD 959–1015) – 
 Ghaznavid dynasty (AD 977–1186) – 
 Annazid dynasty (AD 990–1116) – 
 Kakuyid dynasty (AD 1008–1141) – 
 Nasrid dynasty (AD 1029–1225) – 
 Shabankara (AD 1030–1355) – 
 Hazaraspids (AD 1115–1424)
 Seljuk dynasty (AD 1037–1194) – 
 Eldiguzids (AD 1136–1225) – 
 Atabegs of Yazd (AD 1141–1297, AD 1315–1319) – 
 Salghurids (AD 1148–1282) – 
 Anushtegin dynasty (AD 1153–1220) – 
 Pishkinid dynasty (AD 1155–1231) – 
 Khoy Khanate (AD 1210–1799) – 
 Mongol Empire (AD 1220–1256) – 
 Ilkhanate (AD 1256–1353)
 Qutlugh-Khanids (AD 1222–1306) – 
 Kart dynasty (AD 1244–1381) – 
 Muzaffarid dynasty (AD 1314–1393) – 
 House of Inju (AD 1335–1357) – 
 Chobanids (AD 1335–1357) – 
 Jalairid Sultanate (AD 1336–1432) – 
 Afrasiyab dynasty (AD 1349–1504)
 Marashiyan dynasty (AD 1359–1596) – 
 Timurid dynasty (AD 1370–1507) – 
 Kar-Kiya dynasty (AD 1370s–1592)
 Qara Qoyunlu (AD 1378–1468) – 
 Aq Qoyunlu (AD 1378–1497) – 
 Emirate of Hakkâri (AD 14th century–1847) – 
 Ardalan (AD 14th century–1868) – 
 Mukriyan (AD 1400–1800) – 
 Principality of Mahmudi (AD 1406–1839) – 
 Zarrinnaal (AD 1448–1925) – 
 Safavid dynasty (AD 1501–1722, AD 1729–1736, AD 1749–1750) – 
 Emirate of Bradost (AD 1510–1609) – 
 Principality of Pinyanişi (AD 1548–1823) – 
 Hotak dynasty (AD 1722–1729) – 
 Afsharid dynasty (AD 1736–1749, AD 1750–1796) – 
 Sarab Khanate (AD 1747–?) – 
 Zand dynasty (AD 1751–1794) – 
 Tabriz Khanate (AD 1757–1799) – 
 Qajar dynasty (AD 1789–1925) – 
 Hasan Khan dynasty (AD 1795–1820) – 
 Emirate of Muhammara (AD 19th century–1925)
 Pahlavi dynasty (AD 1925–1979) – 
 Bazrangi dynasty (?–?)

Japan

  (660 BC–present) – 
 Northern Court (AD 1331–1392) – 
 Southern Court (AD 1336–1392) – 
 Later Southern Court (AD 1392–1514)
 House of Aviz-Beja (AD 1580) – 
 Philippine dynasty (AD 1581–1587) – 
 Japanese dynastic feudal domains (AD 16th century–1871)
 Hirosaki Domain (AD 1590–1871) – 
 Morioka Domain (AD 1599–1870) – 
 Sendai Domain (AD 1600–1871) – 
 Yamagata Domain (AD 1600–1871) – 
 Yonezawa Domain (AD 1601–1871) – 
 Kubota Domain (AD 1602–1871) – 
 Sōma Nakamura Domain (AD 1602–1871) – 
 Iwakitaira Domain (AD 1602–1871) – 
 Tanagura Domain (AD 1603–1871) – 
 Matsumae Domain (AD 1604–1871) – 
 Aterazawa Domain (AD 1622–1648) – 
 Shōnai Domain (AD 1622–1871) – 
 Shinjō Domain (AD 1622–1871) – 
 Kaminoyama Domain (AD 1622–1871) – 
 Nikaho Domain (AD 1623–1626) – 
 Honjō Domain (AD 1623–1868) – 
 Kameda Domain (AD 1623–1871) – 
 Miharu Domain (AD 1627–1871) – 
 Dewamaruoka Domain (AD 1632–1653) – 
 Izumi Domain (AD 1634–1871) – 
 Yashima Domain (AD 1640–1658, AD 1868–1871) – 
 Ōyama Domain (AD 1647–1668) – 
 Dewa-Matsuyama Domain (AD 1647–1871) – 
 Iwanuma Domain (AD 1660–1681) – 
 Ichinoseki Domain (AD 1660–1671, AD 1681–1871) – 
 Hachinohe Domain (AD 1664–1871) – 
 Yunagaya Domain (AD 1670–1871) – 
 Murayama Domain (AD 1682–1699) – 
 Nakatsuyama Domain (AD 1695–1868) – 
 Moriyama Domain (AD 1700–1871) – 
 Kubota Shinden Domain (AD 1701–1732) – 
 Iwasaki Domain (AD 1701–1871) – 
 Yonezawa Shinden Domain (AD 1719–1869) – 
 Takabatake Domain (AD 1767–1830) – 
 Nagatoro Domain (AD 1798–1871) – 
 Kuroishi Domain (AD 1809–1871) – 
 Shichinohe Domain (AD 1819–1871) – 
 Tendō Domain (AD 1830–1871) – 
 Tonami Domain (AD 1870–1871) –

Jordan

 Ghassulian
 Levantine states
 Kingdom of Ammon
 Kingdom of Moab
 Kingdom of Edom
 Nabataeans
 Tanukhids (196–1100)
 Ghassanids (220–638)
 Salihids (4th century–6th century)
 Umayyad dynasty – 
 Abbasid dynasty – 
 Jarrahids
  (1921–present) –

Korea

 Gojoseon ( / ) (2333–108 BC) – 
 Dangun Joseon ( / ) (2333–1120 BC) – 
 Gija Joseon ( / ) (1120–194 BC) – 
 Wiman Joseon ( / ) (194–108 BC) – 
 Takri Kingdom ( / ) (c. 5th century–2nd century BC)
 Jin ( / ) (c. 4th century–2nd century BC)
 Dongye ( / ) (c. 3rd century BC–AD 5th century)
 Buyeo ( / ) (239 BC–AD 494)
 Northern Buyeo ( / ) (239–58 BC)
 Jolbon Buyeo ( / ) (86–37 BC)
 Eastern Buyeo ( / ) (86 BC–AD 22)
 Galsa Buyeo ( / ) (AD 22–494)
 Okjeo ( / ) (c. 2nd century BC–AD 5th century)
 Eastern Okjeo ( / ) – 
 Northern Okjeo ( / )
 Han dynasty ( / ) (c. 108 BC–AD 9, AD 30–220) – 
 Nakrang Kingdom ( / ) (c. 1st century BC–AD 37)
 Samhan ( / ) (c. 1st century BC–AD 5th century)
 Jinhan ( / ) (c. 1st century BC–AD 4th century)
 Mahan ( / ) (c. 1st century BC–AD 5th century)
 Byeonhan ( / ) (c. 1st century–4th century AD)
 Three Kingdoms ( / ) (57 BC–AD 668)
 Silla ( / ) (57 BC–AD 935) – 
 Goguryeo ( / ) (37 BC–AD 668) – 
 Baekje ( / ) (18 BC–AD 660) – 
 Tamna ( / ) (57 BC–AD 1402)
 Xin dynasty ( / ) (AD 9–23) – 
 Gaya ( / ) (AD 42–562)
 Daegaya ( / ) (AD 42–562)
 Geumgwan Gaya ( / ) (AD 43–532)
 Bihwa Gaya ( / ) (?–AD 555)
 Ara Gaya ( / ) (?–AD 559)
 Goryeong Gaya ( / ) (?–AD 562)
 Sogaya ( / )
 Seongsan Gaya ( / )
 Cao Wei ( / ) (AD 236–265) – 
 Jin dynasty ( / ) (AD 266–314) – 
 Tang dynasty ( / ) (AD 660–690, AD 705–761) – 
Wu Zhou ( / ) (AD 690–705) – 
 Bodeog ( / ) (AD 674–683) – 
 Northern and Southern States ( / ) (AD 698–892)
 Later Silla ( / ) (AD 668–935) – 
 Balhae ( / ) (AD 698–926) – 
 Jang-an ( / ) (AD 822–825) – 
 Later Three Kingdoms ( / ) (AD 892–936)
 Later Silla ( / ) (AD 668–935) – 
 Later Baekje ( / ) (AD 892–936) – 
 Taebong ( / ) (AD 901–918) – 
 Goryeo ( / ) (AD 918–1392) – 
 Later Sabeol ( / ) (AD 919–927) – 
 Usan ( / ) (?–AD 1022)
 Daewi ( / ) (AD 1135–1136)
 Yuan dynasty ( / ) (AD 1270–1356) – 
 Joseon ( / ) (AD 1392–1897) – 
 Korean Empire ( / ) (AD 1897–1910)
 Daegeum ( / ) (AD 1453) – 
 Imperial House of Japan ( / ) (AD 1910–1945) –

Kuwait
 Dilmun
 Bani Khalid
 Al Jalahma
  (1718–present)

Laos

 Khun Lo dynasty (AD 1353–1438, AD 1442–1583, AD 1591–1778, AD 1780–1791, AD 1811–1858, AD 1946–1975)
 House of Champassak (ນະ ຈຳປາສັກ) (AD 1863–1946)
 Later Lê dynasty (AD 1478–1480)
 Kingdom of Luang Phrabang (ພຣະຣາຊອານາຈັກຫລວງພະບາງ) (AD 1707–1945)
 Tây Sơn dynasty (AD 1778–1802)
 Nguyễn dynasty (AD 1802–1945)

Lebanon
 Eshmunazar dynasty (c. 575–479 BC)
 Baalshillem dynasty (c. 450–333 BC)
 House of Toulouse – 
 House of Poitiers – 
 House of Flanders – 
 House of Rethel – 
 House of Châteaudun – 
 Aleramici – 
 Hohenstaufen – 
 House of Poitiers-Lusignan – 
 Ma'n dynasty (12th century–1697) – 
 Buhturids (12th century–15th century)
 Assaf dynasty (1306–1591)
 Harfush dynasty (15th century–1865)
 Shihab dynasty (1697–1842) –

Malaysia

 Gangga Negara (c. AD 2nd century–1026) – 
 Langkasuka (c. AD 2nd century–15th century)
  (Kesultanan Kedah) (AD 1136–1941, AD 1945–1946, AD 1948–present) – 
 House of Bolkiah (AD 1368–1888) – 
 Malacca Sultanate (Kesultanan Melayu Melaka) (AD 1400–1511)
 Sultanate of Sulu (Kesultanan Sulu) (AD 1405–1882) – 
 Inland dynasty (AD 1457–1688) – 
 House of Aviz (AD 1511–1580) – 
 House of Aviz-Beja (AD 1511–1580) – 
 Most Serene House of Braganza (AD 1640–1641) – 
 Malacca-Johor dynasty (AD 1528–1699) – 
  (AD 1540–1555, AD 1605–1620, AD 1645–1660, AD 1750–1790, AD 1795–1812, AD 1819–1838, AD 1871–1883, AD 1905–1922, AD 1938–1962, AD 1998–present) – 
 House of Waris Jawa (AD 1555–1605, AD 1620–1645, AD 1660–1750, AD 1790–1795, AD 1812–1819, AD 1838–1871, AD 1883–1905, AD 1922–1938, AD 1962–1998) – 
 Philippine dynasty (AD 1581–1640) – 
  (AD 1636–present) – 
 First Kelantanese dynasty (AD 1688–1808) – 
  (AD 1699–present) – 
  (AD 1886–present) – 
  (AD 1723–1900, AD 1918–1947, AD 1873–1985, AD 1988–2007, AD 2016–present) – 
  (AD 1745–present) – 
 House of Waris Ulu Jelebu (AD 1757–?, AD 1820–?, AD 1883–1902, AD 1966–1979) – 
  (AD 1765–present) – 
  (AD 1773–present) – 
 House of Palembang (AD 1780–1899) – 
 House of Waris Sarin (AD 18th century–19th century, AD 1902–1945, AD 1980–2014) – 
  (AD 18th century–present) – 
  (AD 18th century–?, AD 1760–1800, AD 1824–1873, AD 1889–1945, AD 1993–present) – 
 House of Walis Hilir (AD 18th century–?, AD 1800–1824, AD 1873–1889, AD 1945–1993) – 
 House of Hanover (Wangsa Hannover) (AD 1826–1901) – 
 White Rajahs (Raja Putih Sarawak) (AD 1841–1946) – 
 Second Kelantanese dynasty (AD 1842–1902) – 
  (AD 1843–present) – 
  (AD 19th century–1820, ?–AD 1883, AD 1945–1962, AD 2018–present) – 
 House of Saxe-Coburg and Gotha (AD 1901–1917) – 
 House of Windsor (Wangsa Windsor) (AD 1917–1941, AD 1945–1963) – 
 House of Perut Gemencheh (AD 1901–1918, AD 1947–1973, AD 1985–1988, AD 2007–2016) – 
 Imperial House of Japan (AD 1941–1945) –

Maldives

 Solar dynasty
 Early Lunar dynasty
 Theemuge dynasty (AD 1117–1388) – 
 Hilaalee dynasty (AD 1388–1552, AD 1554–1573, AD 1573–1632)
 Utheemu dynasty (AD 1632–1692)
 Hamawi dynasty (AD 1692)
 Isdhoo dynasty (AD 1692–1704)
 Dhiyamigili dynasty (AD 1704–1759, AD 1766–1773)
 Huraa dynasty (AD 1759–1766, AD 1773–1952, AD 1954–1968)

Mesopotamia

 Dynasty I of Kish (c. 2900–2600 BC) – 
 First Mariote Kingdom (2900–2550 BC)
 Dynasty I of Uruk – 
 Dynasty I of Ur (c. 2500–2400 BC)
 Dynasty II of Kish – 
 Second Mariote Kingdom (2500–2290 BC)
 Dynasty I of Lagash (2500–2271 BC)
 Dynasty of Hamazi
 Dynasty II of Uruk
 Dynasty II of Ur
 Dynasty of Adab
 Dynasty of Mari
 Dynasty III of Kish
 Dynasty of Akshak
 Dynasty IV of Kish (c. 24th century–2296 BC)
 Awan dynasty (2350–2150 BC)
 Akkadian Empire (2334–2154 BC)
 Dynasty III of Uruk (2296–2271 BC)
 Shakkanakku dynasty (2266–1830 BC)
 Shimashki dynasty (2200–1900 BC)
 Gutian dynasty (2199–2119 BC)
 Dynasty III of Ur (2112–2004 BC)
 Dynasty II of Lagash (2093–2046 BC)
 Dynasty IV of Uruk (c. 2091 BC–?)
 Dynasty V of Uruk (c. 2055–2048 BC)
 Puzur-Ashur dynasty (2025–1809 BC) – 
 Shamshi-Adad dynasty (1808–1736 BC) – 
 Dynasty of Larsa (1961–1674 BC)
 Dynasty of Isin (1953–1717 BC)
 Sukkalmah dynasty (1900–1500 BC)
 Lim dynasty (1830–1796 BC, 1776–1761 BC)
 Dynasty I of Babylon (1830–1531 BC)
 Yamhad dynasty (1810–1344 BC)
 Sealand dynasty (1732–1460 BC) – 
 Adaside dynasty (1700–745 BC) – 
 Kassite dynasty (1600–1155 BC) – 
 Dynasty IV of Babylon (1155–1025 BC) – 
 Dynasty V of Babylon (1025–1004 BC) – 
 Dynasty VI of Babylon (1004–985 BC) – 
 Dynasty VII of Babylon (985–979 BC) – 
 Dynasty VIII of Babylon (979–943 BC)
 Dynasty IX of Babylon (943–729 BC) – 
 House of Suhi (10th century–848 BC) – 
 House of Astiruwa (848–717 BC) – 
 Dynasty X of Babylon (729–620 BC)
 Sargonid dynasty (722–609 BC) – 
 Pre-Sargonid dynasty (745–722 BC) – 
 Median Kingdom (678–549 BC)
 Chaldean dynasty (626–539 BC) – 
 Achaemenid dynasty (539–330 BC)
 Argead dynasty (330–309 BC) – 
 Seleucid dynasty (321–141 BC, 138–64 BC)
 Hasmonean dynasty (140–37 BC)
 Ptolemaic dynasty (125–121 BC, 83–69 BC, 34–30 BC)
 Kingdom of Osroene (132 BC–AD 216)
 Emesene dynasty (46 BC–AD 161)
 Julio–Claudian dynasty (27 BC–AD 68) – 
 Flavian dynasty (AD 69–96) – 
 Nerva–Antonine dynasty (AD 96–135) – 
 Tanukhids (AD 196–1100)
 Severan dynasty (AD 198–235) – 
 Sasanian dynasty (AD 224–651)
 House of Kayus (AD 226–380)
 Gordian dynasty (AD 238–244) – 
 Decian dynasty (AD 249–253) – 
 Valerian dynasty (AD 253–268) – 
 Illyrian emperors (AD 268–270, AD 273–284) – 
 House of Odaenathus (AD 270–273) – 
 Caran dynasty (AD 282–285) – 
 Lakhmids (AD 300–602)
 Constantinian dynasty (AD 305–363) – 
 Valentinianic dynasty (AD 364–379) – 
 Theodosian dynasty (AD 379–457) – 
 Salihids (AD 4th century–6th century)
 Leonid dynasty (AD 457–518) – 
 Justinian dynasty (AD 518–602) – 
 Heraclian dynasty (AD 610–637) – 
 Umayyad dynasty (AD 661–750) – 
 Abbasid dynasty (AD 750–1258) – 
 Bahdinan (AD 1376–1843)
 Samanid Empire (AD 819–999)
 Tahirid dynasty (AD 821–873)
 Saffarid dynasty (AD 861–1003)
 Mazyadid dynasty (AD 861–14th century)
 Hamdanid dynasty (AD 895–1002)
 Sallarid dynasty (AD 919–1062)
 Buyid dynasty (AD 934–1062)
 Banu Mazyad (AD 961–1160)
 Marwanids (AD 983–1085)
 Numayrid dynasty (AD 990–1081)
 Uqaylid dynasty (AD 990–1096)
 Annazids (AD 990–1116)
 Hadhabani (AD 10th century–11th century)
 Mirdasid dynasty (AD 1024–1080)
 Seljuq dynasty (AD 1037–1077)
 Anushtegin dynasty (AD 1077–1221) – 
 Rubenids (AD 1080–1226) – 
 Artuqid dynasty (AD 1101–1409)
 Burid dynasty (AD 1104–1154)
 Al Fadl (AD 1107–1538) – 
 Zengid dynasty (AD 1127–1250)
 Eldiguzids (AD 1135–1225)
 Ayyubid dynasty (AD 1171–1221)
 Mongol Empire (AD 1221–1259)
 Ilkhanate (AD 1256–1353)
 Hethumids (AD 1226–1341) – 
 Emirate of Kilis (AD 13th century–1264)
 Sutayids (AD 1312–1351)
 Jalairid Sultanate (AD 1335–1432)
 House of Poitiers-Lusignan (AD 1342–1375) – 
 Timurid dynasty (AD 1370–1507)
 Qara Qoyunlu (AD 1374–1468)
 Aq Qoyunlu (AD 1378–1501)
 Harfush dynasty (AD 15th century–19th century)
 Safavid dynasty (AD 1501–1736)
 Emirate of Bradost (AD 1510–1609)
 Ottoman dynasty (AD 1534–1864, AD 1831–1920)
 Soran Emirate (AD 16th century–19th century)
 Baban (AD 1649–1850)
 Mamluk dynasty (AD 1704–1831)
 Jalili dynasty (AD 1726–1834)
 House of Windsor (AD 1920–1932) – 
 House of Hashim (AD 1920, AD 1932–1958) –

Mongolia

 Luandi clan (209 BC–AD 93) – 
 Xianbei state (c. AD 93–234)
 Rouran Khaganate (AD 330–555)
 Ashina tribe (AD 552–630, AD 682–744) – 
 Xueyantuo (AD 628–646)
 Tang dynasty (Тан улс) (AD 647–682) – 
 Türgesh Khaganate (Түргэш) (AD 699–766)
 Uyghur Khaganate (AD 744–840)
 Yenisei Kyrgyz Khaganate (AD 840–1207)
 Liao dynasty (Их Ляо улс) (AD 916–1125)
 Western Liao (Баруун Ляо) (AD 1124–1218)
 Khamag Mongol (Хамаг Монголын ханлиг) (AD 10th century–1206)
 Keraite state (Хэрэйд) (AD 11th century–13th century)
 Naiman state (Найман) (?–AD 1206)
 Mongol Empire (Их Монгол улс) (AD 1206–1368)
 Yuan dynasty (Юань улс) (AD 1271–1368) – 
 Northern Yuan (Умард Юань) (AD 1368–1635)
 Altan Khanate (AD 1609–1691)
 Tüsheet Khanate (AD 1691–1923)
 Setsen Khanate (AD 1691–1923)
 Jasaghtu Khanate (AD 1691–1923)
 Alliance of the Four Oirats (Дөрвөн Ойрд) (AD 1399–1634)
 Qing dynasty (Чин улс) (AD 1636–1912) – 
 Later Jin (Хожуу Алтан) (AD 1635–1636)
 Bogd Khanate of Mongolia (Олноо өргөгдсөн Монгол улс) (AD 1911–1919, AD 1921–1924) –

Myanmar (Burma)

 Pyu dynasty (c. 3000 BC–AD 400)
 First Tagaung dynasty (c. 850 BC–?) – 
 Second Tagaung dynasty (c. 600 BC–?) – 
 Thaton Kingdom (သုဝဏ္ဏဘူမိ) (4th century BC–AD 1057)
 Kingdom of Pong (AD 1st century–1479)
 Sarekhitara dynasty (c. AD 400–1044)
 Early Pagan Kingdom (ခေတ်ဦး ပုဂံ ပြည်) (c. AD 650–1044)
 Pagan Kingdom (ပုဂံခေတ်) (AD 1044–1287, AD 1289–1297)
 Yuan dynasty (ယွမ်မင်းဆက်) (AD 1274–1368) – 
 Hanthawaddy Kingdom (ဟံသာဝတီ နေပြည်တော်) (AD 1287–1539, AD 1550–1552)
 Myinsaing Kingdom (မြင်စိုင်းခေတ်) (AD 1297–1313)
 Pinya Kingdom (ပင်းယခေတ်) (AD 1313–1365)
 Sagaing Kingdom (စစ်ကိုင်း နေပြည်တော်) (AD 1315–1365)
 Kingdom of Ava (အင်းဝခေတ်) (AD 1364–1555)
 Innwa dynasty (AD 1365–1486)
 Kingdom of Mrauk-U (AD 1429–1785)
 Prome Kingdom (ဒုတိယ သရေခေတ္တရာ နေပြည်တော်) (AD 1482–1542)
 Toungoo dynasty (တောင်ငူမင်းဆက်) (AD 1510–1752) – 
 Nyaungyan dynasty (AD 1599–1752) – 
 Restored Hanthawaddy Kingdom (ဟံသာဝတီ နေပြည်တော်) (AD 1740–1757)
 Konbaung dynasty (ကုန်းဘောင်ခေတ်) (AD 1752–1885)
 House of Hanover (AD 1824–1901) – 
 House of Saxe-Coburg and Gotha (AD 1901–1917) – 
 House of Windsor (AD 1917–1942, AD 1945–1948) – 
 Imperial House of Japan (AD 1942–1945) –

Nepal
 Kirat dynasty
 Licchavi (लिच्छवि) (c. AD 400–750)
 Tibetan Empire (AD 618–842)
 Simroun dynasty (AD 1097–1324)
 Khasa-Malla Kingdom (खस मल्ल राज्य) (AD 11th century–14th century)
 Malla dynasty (AD 1201–1779)
 Kingdom of Mustang (AD 1380–2008)
 Shah dynasty (शाह वंश) (AD 1559–2008)
 Rana Dynasty
(राणा वंश) (AD 1857-1951)

Oman

 Seljuq dynasty (AD 1037–1154)
 Nabhani dynasty (AD 1154–1624)
 Ya'rubid dynasty (AD 1624–1749)
 Wajihids
  (AD 1749–present)

Palestine
 House of Gideon
 House of Saul (c. 1020–1010 BC) – 
 Davidic line (c. 1003–586 BC) – 
 House of Jeroboam (c. 931–909 BC) – 
 House of Baasha (c. 909–885 BC) – 
 House of Zimri (c. 884 BC) – 
 House of Omri (c. 884–841 BC) – 
 House of Jehu (c. 841–752 BC) – 
 House of Shallum (c. 752 BC) – 
 House of Gadi (c. 752–740 BC) – 
 House of Pekah (c. 752–732 BC) – 
 House of Hoshea (c. 732–721 BC) – 
 Hasmonean dynasty (104–37 BC)
 Herodian dynasty (47 BC–AD 100)
 Julio–Claudian dynasty (AD 6–68) – 
 Flavian dynasty (AD 68–96) – 
 Nerva–Antonine dynasty (AD 96–192) – 
 Severan dynasty (AD 193–235) – 
 Gordian dynasty (AD 238–244) – 
 Decian dynasty (AD 249–253) – 
 Valerian dynasty (AD 253–268) – 
 Illyrian emperors (AD 268–270) – 
 House of Odaenathus (AD 270–273) – 
 Caran dynasty (AD 273–285) – 
 Constantinian dynasty (AD 305–363) – 
 Valentinianic dynasty (AD 364–390) – 
 Theodosian dynasty (AD 390–457) – 
 Leonid dynasty (AD 457–518) – 
 Justinian dynasty (AD 518–602) – 
 Heraclian dynasty (AD 610–636) – 
 Umayyad dynasty (AD 661–750) – 
 Abbasid dynasty (AD 750–1099) – 
 Jarrahids (AD 971–1107)
 House of Flanders (AD 1099–1118) – 
 House of Rethel (AD 1118–1153) – 
 House of Châteaudun (AD 1131–1185, AD 1186–1205) – 
 Aleramici (AD 1183–1186, AD 1190–1192, AD 1205–1212) – 
 House of Lusignan (AD 1186–1192, AD 1198–1205) – 
 House of Poitiers-Lusignan (AD 1268–1324)
 House of Brienne (AD 1210–1228) – 
 Hohenstaufen (AD 1225–1268) – 
 Bahri dynasty (AD 1291–1382) – 
 Burji dynasty (AD 1382–1517) – 
 Ottoman dynasty (AD 1516–1917) – 
 Al-Zayadina
 Ridwan dynasty (AD 1560–1690) – 
 Turabay dynasty (AD 16th century–1677)
 House of Windsor (AD 1920–1948) –

The Philippines
 Malay dynasties
 The Datu Puti Lineage (Ruled the defunct Confederation of Madya-as) (13th century – 1565)
 Hindu dynasties
 The Lakandula Dynasty (Ruled the defunct Kingdom of Tondo) (1150–1589)
 The House of Tupas (Ruled the defunct Rajahnate of Cebu) (up to 1565)
 The House of Sri Bata Shaja (Ruled the defunct Rajahnate of Butuan) (989–1586)
 Muslim dynasties
 The Ud-Din Royal Hashemite Family (A dynasty which ruled the Maguinadanao Sultanate) (1480–1830)
 Maynila (1500–1571)
  (Rules the Sulu Sultanate) (1823 – present)
 The Sultan Diagaborola Balindong Bsar Lineage (Ruled the Lanao Confederation of sultanates in Lanao)
 Under foreign rule
 House of Habsburg (1565–1700) – 
 House of Bourbon-Anjou (1700–1808, 1813–1868, 1874–1898) – 
 House of Hanover (1762–1764) – 
 House of Bonaparte (1808–1813) – 
 House of Savoy (1870–1873) – 
 Imperial House of Japan (1942–1945) –

Qatar
 Kingdom of Dilmun
 Kingdom of Ormus
 Al Bin Ali
 Bani Khalid
 House of Khalifa
  (1850–present)

Ryukyu Islands
 Tenson dynasty (?–AD 1185) – 
 Shunten dynasty (AD 1187–1259)
 Eiso dynasty (AD 1260–1349)
 Sanzan period (AD 1314–1429)
 Haniji dynasty (AD 1314–1419) – 
 Satto dynasty (AD 1314–1429) – 
 Ōzato dynasty (AD 1314–1429) – 
 First Shō dynasty (AD 1406–1469)
 Second Shō dynasty (AD 1469–1879)
  (AD 1879–1945, AD 1972–present) –

Saudi Arabia

 Lakhmids (AD 300–602)
 Umayyad dynasty (661–750) – 
 Abbasid dynasty (750–1258) – 
 House of Ali (867–1061, 1063–1925)
 Banu Ukhaidhir (867–11th century)
 Musawid dynasty (967–1061) – 
 Sulaymanids (1063–1174) – 
 Hawashim dynasty (1063–1201) – 
 Banu Qatadah (1201–1925) – 
 House of Hashim (1916–1925) – 
 Uyunid dynasty (1076–1253)
 Usfurids (1253–1320)
 Jabrids (1417–1524)
 Bani Khalid Emirate (1669–1796)
  (1744–1818, 1824–1891, 1902–present) – 
 Ottoman dynasty (1818–1824) – 
 Rashidi dynasty (1836–1921) – 
 Idrisid Emirate of Asir (1909–1930)

Siberia
 Luandi clan (209 BC–AD 93) – 
 Xianbei state (c. AD 93–234)
 Rouran Khaganate (AD 330–555)
 Ashina tribe (AD 552–657, AD 682–744) – 
 Tang dynasty (AD 647–682) – 
 Bohai (AD 698–926)
 Uyghur Khaganate (AD 744–840)
 Yenisei Kyrgyz Khaganate (AD 840–1207)
 Liao dynasty (AD 916–1125)
 Khamag Mongol (AD 10th century–1206)
 Jin dynasty (AD 1115–1234)
 Mongol Empire (AD 1207–1368)
 Golden Horde (AD 1240s–1502)
 Yuan dynasty (AD 1271–1368) – 
 Northern Yuan (AD 1368–1635)
 Ming dynasty (AD 1388–1616) – 
 Shaybanid dynasty (AD 1428–1598) – 
 House of Siberia – 
 Godunov dynasty (AD 1598–1605) – 
 Rurik dynasty (AD 1605–1610) – 
 House of Vasa (AD 1610–1613) – 
 House of Romanov (AD 1613–1762, AD 1796–1917, AD 1922) – 
 House of Holstein-Gottorp-Romanov (AD 1762, AD 1796–1917, AD 1922)
 Qing dynasty (AD 1636–1911) – 
 Later Jin (AD 1616–1636)
 House of Ascania (AD 1762–1796) –

Singapore
 Srivijaya (AD 650–1299)
 Kingdom of Singapura (AD 1299–1398)
 Malacca Sultanate (AD 1400–1511)
 Malacca-Johor dynasty (AD 1528–1699) – 
 Bendahara dynasty (AD 1699–1819) – 
 House of Hanover (AD 1819–1901) – 
 House of Saxe-Coburg and Gotha (AD 1901–1917) – 
 House of Windsor (AD 1917–1942, AD 1945–1963) – 
 Imperial House of Japan (AD 1942–1945) –

Sri Lanka

 Sinhala Kingdom (543 BC–AD 1597)
 House of Vijaya (543–237 BC, 215–205 BC, 161–103 BC, 89 BC–AD 66) – 
 House of Lambakanna I (AD 66–436)
 House of Moriya (AD 463–691)
 House of Lambakanna II (AD 691–1055) – 
 House of Vijayabahu (AD 1055–1187, AD 1197–1200, AD 1209–1210, AD 1211–1212)
 House of Kalinga (AD 1187–1197, AD 1200–1209)
 House of Siri Sanga Bo (AD 1220–1597)
 Jaffna Kingdom (AD 1232–1619)
 Savakan Lotus Dynasty (AD 1255–1277)
 Aryacakravarti dynasty (AD 1262–1450, AD 1467–1619)
 House of Siri Sanga Bo (AD 1450–1467)
 Kingdom of Kandy (AD 1469–1815)
 House of Siri Sanga Bo (AD 1469–1590)
 House of Dinajara (AD 1590–1739)
 Nayaks of Kandy (AD 1739–1815)
 Kingdom of Sitawaka (AD 1521–1594)
 House of Siri Sanga Bo (AD 1521–1594)
 British Ceylon (AD 1815–1948)
 House of Hanover (AD 1815–1901)
 House of Saxe-Coburg and Gotha (AD 1901–1917)
 House of Windsor (AD 1917–1972) –

Thailand (Siam)

 Singhanavati (สิงหนวัติ)
 Lavachakkaraj dynasty (AD 638–1292) – 
 Phra Ruang dynasty (ราชวงศ์พระร่วง) (AD 1238–1438) – 
 Mangrai dynasty (AD 1292–1558) – 
 Uthong dynasty (ราชวงศ์อู่ทอง) (AD 1350–1370, AD 1388–1409) – 
 Suphannaphum dynasty (ราชวงศ์สุพรรณภูมิ) (AD 1370–1388, AD 1409–1569) – 
 Inland dynasty (AD 1457–1688) – 
 Sukhothai dynasty (ราชวงศ์สุโขทัย) (AD 1569–1629) – 
 Sultanate of Singora (รัฐสุลต่านซิงกอรา) (AD 1605–1680)
 Prasart Thong dynasty (ราชวงศ์ปราสาททอง) (AD 1629–1688) – 
 Baan Plu Luang dynasty (ราชวงศ์บ้านพลูหลวง) (AD 1688–1767) – 
 First Kelantanese dynasty (AD 1688–1808) – 
 Chet Ton dynasty (เชื้อเจ็ดตน) (AD 1732–1943) – 
 Thonburi Kingdom (ราชวงศ์ธนบุรี) (AD 1767–1782)
  (ราชวงศ์จักรี) (AD 1782–present) – 
 Second Kelantanese dynasty (AD 1842–1902) –

Timor-Leste (East Timor)
 Most Serene House of Braganza (AD 1702–1910) – 
 House of Braganza-Saxe-Coburg and Gotha (AD 1853–1910) –

United Arab Emirates

 Seljuq dynasty (1041–1187) – 
  (1708–present) – 
  (1761–present) – 
  (1768–present) – 
  (1816–present) – 
  (1833–present) – 
  (1879–present) –

Vietnam

 Hồng Bàng dynasty ( / ) (2879–258 BC)
 Càn line ( / ) (2879–2794 BC)
 Khảm line ( / ) (2793–2525 BC)
 Cấn line ( / ) (2524–2253 BC)
 Chấn line ( / ) (2252–1913 BC)
 Tốn line ( / ) (1912–1713 BC)
 Ly line ( / ) (1712–1632 BC)
 Khôn line ( / ) (1631–1432 BC)
 Đoài line ( / ) (1431–1332 BC)
 Giáp line ( / ) (1331–1252 BC)
 Ất line ( / ) (1251–1162 BC)
 Bính line ( / ) (1161–1055 BC)
 Đinh line ( / ) (1054–969 BC)
 Mậu line ( / ) (968–854 BC)
 Kỷ line ( / ) (853–755 BC)
 Canh line ( / ) (754–661 BC)
 Tân line ( / ) (660–569 BC)
 Nhâm line ( / ) (568–409 BC)
 Qúy line ( / ) (408–258 BC)
 Thục dynasty ( / ) (257–207 BC)
 Triệu dynasty ( / ) (204–111 BC) – 
 Han dynasty ( / ) (111 BC–AD 9, AD 23–40, AD 43–220) – 
 Xin dynasty ( / ) (AD 9–23) – 
 Trưng sisters ( / ) (AD 40–43) – 
 Eastern Wu ( / ) (AD 229–265, AD 271–280) – 
 Jin dynasty ( / ) (AD 266–271, AD 280–420) – 
 Liu Song ( / ) (AD 420–479) – 
 Southern Qi ( / ) (AD 479–502) – 
 Liang dynasty ( / ) (AD 502–544) – 
 Early Lý dynasty ( / ) (AD 544–602)
 Sui dynasty ( / ) (AD 602–618) – 
 Tang dynasty ( / ) (AD 621–690, AD 705–905) – 
 Wu Zhou ( / ) (AD 690–705) – 
 Khúc clan ( / ) (AD 905–930)
 Southern Han ( / ) (AD 930–938) – 
 Ngô dynasty ( / ) (AD 939–965)
 Đinh dynasty ( / ) (AD 968–980)
 Early Lê dynasty ( / ) (AD 980–1009)
 Lý dynasty ( / ) (AD 1009–1225)
 Trần dynasty ( / ) (AD 1225–1400)
 Later Trần dynasty ( / ) (AD 1407–1413)
 Hồ dynasty ( / ) (AD 1400–1407)
 Ming dynasty ( / ) (AD 1407–1427) – 
 Later Lê dynasty ( / ) (AD 1428–1527, AD 1533–1789)
 Primitive Lê dynasty ( / ) (AD 1428–1527)
 Revival Lê dynasty ( / ) (AD 1533–1789)
 Mạc dynasty ( / ) (AD 1527–1677)
 Bầu lords ( / ) (AD 1527–1689)
 Trịnh lords ( / ) (AD 1545–1787)
 Nguyễn lords ( / ) (AD 1558–1777)
 Principality of Hà Tiên ( / ) (AD 1707–1832) – 
 Tây Sơn dynasty ( / ) (AD 1778–1802)
 Nguyễn dynasty ( / ) (AD 1802–1945) – 
 House of Bonaparte (AD 1862–1870) –

Yemen
 Kingdom of Saba' (c. 1200 BC–AD 275)
 Hadramaut
 Kingdom of Awsan (800–500 BC)
 Kingdom of Ma'in (8th century–100 BC)
 Minaeans
 Kingdom of Ḥaḑramawt (8th century BC–AD 300)
 Kingdom of Qatabān (4th century BC–AD 200)
 Himyarite Kingdom (110 BC–AD 525)
 Solomonic dynasty (AD 520–570) – 
 Sasanian dynasty (AD 570–630) – 
 Umayyad dynasty (AD 661–750) – 
 Abbasid dynasty (AD 750–897) – 
 Ziyadid dynasty (AD 818–1018)
 Yu'firids (AD 847–997)
 Rassids (AD 897–1596, AD 1918–1970)
 Qasimids (AD 1597–1849) – 
 Najahid dynasty (AD 1022–1158)
 Sulayhid dynasty (AD 1047–1138)
 Sulaymanids (AD 1063–1174)
 Zurayids (AD 1083–1174)
 Yemeni Hamdanids (AD 1099–1174)
 First Hatimid line (AD 1099–1116)
 Banu‘l-Qubaib line (AD 1116–1139)
 Second Hatimid line (AD 1139–1174)
 Mahdids (AD 1159–1174)
 Ayyubid dynasty (AD 1174–1229)
 Rasulid dynasty (AD 1229–1454)
 Kathiri State of Seiyun in Hadhramaut (AD 14th century–1967)
 Tahirid dynasty (AD 1454–1517)
 Emirate of Dhala (AD 15th century–1967)
 Fadhli Sultanate (AD 15th century–1967)
 House of Aviz-Beja (AD 1506–1511) – 
 Ottoman dynasty (AD 1538–1635, AD 1872–1918) – 
 Wahidi Sultanate of Balhaf in Hadhramaut (AD 1640–1967)
 Wahidi Sultanate of Habban (AD 1640–1967)
 Emirate of Beihan (AD 1680–1967)
 Yemeni Zaidi State
 Sultanate of Lahej (AD 1728–1967)
 `Alawi Sheikhdom (AD 1743–1967)
 Mawsata (AD 1780–1967)
 Mutawakkilite Kingdom of Yemen
 Sultanate of Lower Yafa (AD 1800–1967)
 Upper Yafa (AD 1800–1967)
 Hadrami Sheikhdom (AD 1820–1967)
 Wahidi Sultanate of Bir ‘Ali (AD 1830–1967)
 Muflihi Sheikdom (AD 1850–1967)
 Qu'aiti State in Hadhramaut (AD 1858–1967)
 Mahra Sultanate of Qishn and Socotra (AD 1886–1967)
 `Aqrabi Sheikhdom (AD 18th century–1967)
 Dathina Sheikhdom (AD 18th century–1967)
 `Awdhali Sultanate (AD 18th century–1967)
 Bu`si Sheikdom (AD 18th century–1967)
 Hawshabi Sultanate of Musaymir (AD 18th century–1967)
 Lower Aulaqi Sultanate (AD 18th century–1967)
 Sheikhdom of Shaib (AD 18th century–1967)
 Upper Aulaqi Sheikhdom (AD 18th century–1967)
 Upper Aulaqi Sultanate (AD 18th century–1967)
 Dhubi Sheikhdom (AD 18th century–1967)
 Qutaibi Sheikhdom
 House of Windsor (AD 1932–1963) –

List of dynasties in Europe

Albania

 Julio–Claudian dynasty (27 BC–AD 68)
 Flavian dynasty (AD 69–96)
 Nerva–Antonine dynasty (AD 96–192)
 Severan dynasty (AD 193–235)
 Gordian dynasty (AD 238–244)
 Decian dynasty (AD 249–253)
 Valerian dynasty (AD 253–268)
 Caran dynasty (AD 282–285)
 Constantinian dynasty (AD 305–363) – 
 Valentinianic dynasty (AD 364–392) – 
 Theodosian dynasty (AD 379–457) – 
 Leonid dynasty (AD 457–518) – 
 Justinian dynasty (AD 518–602) – 
 Heraclian dynasty (AD 610–711) – 
 Isaurian dynasty (AD 717–802) – 
 Nikephorian dynasty (AD 802–813) – 
 Amorian dynasty (AD 820–867) – 
 Macedonian dynasty (AD 867–1056) – 
 Doukid dynasty (AD 1059–1081) – 
 Komnenos dynasty (AD 1081–1185) – 
 Angelos dynasty (AD 1185–1204) – 
 Palaiologos dynasty (AD 1261–1453) – 
 Progoni (AD 1190–1216) – 
 Capetian House of Anjou (AD 1272–1368)
 Sratsimir dynasty (AD 1346–1372) – 
 Balšić noble family (AD 1356–1421) – 
 Thopia family (AD 1358–1382, AD 1385–1392) – 
 Spata family (AD 1358–1416) – 
 Losha family (AD 1359–1374) – 
 Zenevisi family (AD 1386–1418) – 
 House of Kastrioti (AD 1389–1444) – 
 Muzaka family (AD 1396–1417) – 
 Ottoman dynasty (AD 1479–1912)
 House of Wied-Neuwied (AD 1914–1925) – 
 House of Zogu (AD 1928–1939)
 House of Savoy (AD 1939–1943)

Austria

 House of Babenberg (976–1246)
 House of Habsburg (1278–1780) – 
 Albertinian line (1379–1439, 1440–1457)
 Leopoldian line (1379–1493)
 House of Habsburg-Lorraine (1780–1918/19)

Barbarians

Avars

Bavarii
 Agilolfing dynasty

Burgundians
 House of the Kings of the Burgundians (4th century–534) –

Franks
 Merovingian dynasty (481–751)
 Carolingian dynasty (751–843)
 Arnulfings or Pippinids, mayors of the palaces. Ancestors of the Carolingians.

Huns
 Attilid dynasty
 House of Dulo Bulgaria (390–503) A Nominalia of the Bulgarian khans genealogy claims that the Dulo clan is descended from Attila the Hun.

Lombards

 Lething dynasty (until early 6th century)
 Gausian dynasty (546–572)
 Arodingian dynasty (635–653)
 Bavarian dynasty (615–635, 653–712)

Ostrogoths
 Amal dynasty (before 474–536)

Suebi
 Suebic dynasty (409–585)

Vandals
 Hasdingi (before 407–534)

Visigoths
 Balt dynasty (395–531)

Belgium

Medieval feudal states
 House of Flanders (rulers of various entities in the Southern Netherlands and Crusader states 863–1280) 
 House of Dampierre (rulers of various entities in the Southern Netherlands and France 1247–1405)
 House of Reginar (rulers of various entities in the Southern Netherlands c. 770–1406)
 House of Burgundy (1384–1482)

Kingdom of Belgium
 House of Saxe-Coburg and Gotha (1831–1920)
  (1920–present)
 House of Hohenzollern (1914–1918) –

Bohemia/Czechia

Great Moravia
 Moymirid dynasty (c.830–906?)

Duchy of Bohemia
 Přemyslid dynasty (c. 870–1198)

Kingdom of Bohemia
 Přemyslid dynasty (1085–1092, 1158–1172, 1198–1306; heredity of the royal title established in 1212)
 House of Gorizia (1306, 1307–1310)
 House of Habsburg (1306–1307, 1437–1439, 1453–1457, 1526–1780)
 House of Luxembourg (1310–1437; Lands of the Bohemian Crown established in 1348)
 House of Poděbrady (1457–1471)
 House of Hunyadi (1469–1490; in opposition to the House of Poděbrady and from 1471 to the House of Jagiellon; never crowned)
 House of Jagiellon (1471–1526)
 House of Wittelsbach (1619–1620, 1741–1743; in opposition to the House of Habsburg)
 House of Habsburg-Lorraine (1780–1918)

Bosnia

 House of Boričević (1154–1163)
 House of Kulinić (1163–1250)
 House of Kotromanić (1250–1463)
 House of Berislavić (1463–1527)

Bulgaria

 Achaemenid dynasty (511–479 BC) – 
 Julio-Claudian dynasty (AD 46–68) – 
 Flavian dynasty (AD 69–96) – 
 Nerva–Antonine dynasty (AD 96–192) – 
 Severan dynasty (AD 193–235) – 
 Gordian dynasty (AD 238–244) – 
 Decian dynasty (AD 249–253) – 
 Valerian dynasty (AD 253–268) – 
 Caran dynasty (AD 282–285) – 
 Constantinian dynasty (AD 305–363) – 
 Valentinianic dynasty (AD 364–379) – 
 Theodosian dynasty (AD 379–457) – 
 Leonid dynasty (AD 457–518) – 
 Justinian dynasty (AD 518–602) – 
 Heraclian dynasty (AD 610–681) – 
 Dulo clan (AD 681–753, AD 768–997) – 
 Krum's dynasty (AD 803–997) – 
 Vokil clan (AD 753–762, AD 766) – 
 Ugain clan (AD 762–765) – 
 Cometopuli dynasty (AD 997–1018) – 
 Macedonian dynasty (AD 1018–1056) – 
 Komnenos dynasty (AD 1056–1185) – 
 Asen dynasty (AD 1185–1280) – 
 Sratsimir dynasty (AD 1346–1417) – 
 Terter dynasty (AD 1280–1292, AD 1300–1322) – 
 Smilets dynasty (AD 1292–1299) – 
 Borjigin clan (AD 1299–1300) – 
 House of Shishman (AD 1323–1422) – 
 Ottoman dynasty (AD 1396–1878) – 
 Battenberg family (AD 1878–1886) – 
 House of Saxe-Coburg and Gotha (AD 1887–1946) –

Croatia

 Julio–Claudian dynasty (27 BC–AD 68) – 
 Flavian dynasty (AD 69–96) – 
 Nerva–Antonine dynasty (AD 96–192) – 
 Severan dynasty (AD 193–235) – 
 Gordian dynasty (AD 238–244) – 
 Decian dynasty (AD 249–253) – 
 Valerian dynasty (AD 253–268) – 
 Illyrian emperors (AD 268–284) – 
 Caran dynasty (AD 282–285) – 
 Constantinian dynasty (AD 305–363) – 
 Valentinianic dynasty (AD 364–379) – 
 Theodosian dynasty (AD 379–457) – 
 Leonid dynasty (AD 457–480) – 
 Trpimirović dynasty (c. AD 845–864, AD 878–879, AD 892–1091) – 
 Domagojević dynasty (AD 864–878, AD 879–892) – 
 Árpád dynasty (AD 1091–1095, AD 1102–1301)
 Snačić family (AD 1093–1097)
 Capetian House of Anjou (AD 1290–1414)
 Přemyslid dynasty (AD 1301–1305)
 House of Wittelsbach (AD 1305–1308)
 Limburg-Luxemburg dynasty (AD 1387–1437)
 House of Habsburg (AD 1437–1439, AD 1444–1457, AD 1526–1780)
 House of Habsburg-Lorraine (AD 1780–1918)
 Jagiellonian dynasty (AD 1440–1444, (AD 1490–1526)
 Hunyadi family (AD 1458–1490)
 Zápolya family (AD 1526–1570)
 Karađorđević dynasty (AD 1918–1941)
 House of Savoy-Aosta (AD 1941–1943) –

Denmark

 Scylding (pre AD 8th century) – 
 House of Olaf (c. AD 9th century–10th century) – 
 House of Knýtlinga (AD 916–1042) – 
 House of Estridsen (AD 1047–1332, AD 1340–1375, AD 1376–1412)
 Sunnivasson descendant (AD 1137–1146)
 Fairhair dynasty (AD 1042–1047) – 
 House of Bjelbo (AD 1376–1387)
 House of Griffin (AD 1396–1439)
 House of Palatinate-Neumarkt (AD (1439)1440–1448)
 House of Oldenburg (AD 1448–1533, AD 1534–1863)
  (AD 1863–present)

England

 Julio–Claudian dynasty (AD 43–68) – 
 Flavian dynasty (AD 69–96) – 
 Nerva–Antonine dynasty (AD 96–192) – 
 Severan dynasty (AD 193–235) – 
 Gordian dynasty (AD 238–244) – 
 Decian dynasty (AD 249–253) – 
 Valerian dynasty (AD 253–260) – 
 Gallic Empire (260–274 AD) – 
 Illyrian emperors (AD 274–284) – 
 Caran dynasty (AD 282–285) – 
 Constantinian dynasty (AD 305–363) – 
 Valentinianic dynasty (AD 364–392) – 
 Theodosian dynasty (AD 392–410) – 
 Wuffingas (AD 6th century–749) – 
 House of Wessex (AD 519–645, AD 648–1013, AD 1014–1016, AD 1042–1066)
 Iclingas (AD 527–606, AD 626–656, AD 658–796) – 
 C dynasty of Mercia (AD 796–823, AD 840)
 East Anglian dynasty (AD 749–794, AD 796–800, AD 927–869) – 
 B dynasty of Mercia (AD 757, AD 823–826, AD 840–874) – 
 W dynasty of Mercia (AD 827–829, AD 830–840) – 
 House of Knýtlinga (AD 1013–1014, AD 1016–1042) – 
 House of Godwin (AD 1066)
 House of Normandy (AD 1066–1135)
 House of Blois (AD 1135–1154)
 Angevins (AD 1154–1216)
 House of Plantagenet (AD 1216–1399)
 House of Lancaster (AD 1399–1461, AD 1470–1471)
 House of York (AD 1461–1470, AD 1471–1485)
 House of Capet (AD 1216–1217) – 
 House of Tudor (AD 1485–1603)
 House of Stuart (AD 1603–1649, AD 1660–1714) – 
 House of Hanover (AD 1714–1901) – 
 House of Saxe-Coburg and Gotha (AD 1901–1917) – 
  (AD 1917–present) –

Estonia

 House of Estridsen (AD 1219–1332, AD 1340–1346) – 
 Jagiellonian dynasty (AD 1561–1572, AD 1575–1587) – 
 House of Vasa (AD 1561–1654, AD 1587–1621) – 
 House of Valois-Angoulême (AD 1573–1575) – 
 Báthory family (AD 1576–1586) – 
 House of Palatinate-Zweibrücken (AD 1654–1720) – 
 House of Hesse (AD 1720–1721) – 
 House of Romanov (AD 1721–1762, AD 1796–1917) – 
 House of Holstein-Gottorp-Romanov (AD 1762, AD 1796–1917) – 
 House of Ascania (AD 1762–1796) – 
 House of Hohenzollern (AD 1917–1918) – 
 House of Mecklenburg (AD Nov. 1918) –

Faroe Islands
 Saint Olaf dynasty (AD 1035–1047) – 
 Hardrada dynasty (AD 1046–1135, AD 1161–1184) – 
 Gille dynasty (AD 1130–1162, AD 1204–1217) – 
 House of Sverre (AD 1184–1204, AD 1217–1319) – 
 House of Bjelbo (AD 1319–1387) – 
 House of Estridsen (AD 1380–1412) – 
 House of Griffin (AD 1389–1442) – 
 House of Palatinate-Neumarkt (AD 1442–1448) – 
 House of Bonde (AD 1449–1450) – 
 House of Oldenburg (AD 1450–1863) – 
  (AD 1863–1940, AD 1945–present) – 
 House of Windsor (AD 1940–1945) –

Finland

 House of Bjelbo (Bjälbo-suku) (AD 1250–1364) – 
 House of Mecklenburg (AD 1364–1395) – 
 House of Estridsen (AD 1389–1412) – 
 House of Griffin (AD 1412–1439) – 
 House of Wittelsbach (AD 1441–1448, AD 1654–1720) – 
 House of Palatinate-Neumarkt (AD 1441–1448)
 House of Palatinate-Zweibrücken (Pfalzilainen suku) (AD 1654–1720)
 House of Bonde (AD 1448–1457, AD 1464–1470) – 
 House of Oldenburg (AD 1457–1464, AD 1497–1501, AD 1520–1523) – 
 House of Holstein-Gottorp (AD 1751–1809) – 
 House of Holstein-Gottorp-Romanov (AD 1809–1917) – 
 House of Vasa (Vaasa-suku) (AD 1523–1654) – 
 House of Hesse-Kassel (AD 1720–1751, AD 1918) –

France

 Julio–Claudian dynasty (Julio-Claudiens) (27 BC–AD 68) – 
 Flavian dynasty (Flaviens) (AD 69–96) – 
 Nerva–Antonine dynasty (Antonins) (AD 96–192) – 
 Severan dynasty (Sévères) (AD 193–235) – 
 Gordian dynasty (AD 238–244) – 
 Decian dynasty (AD 249–253) – 
 Valerian dynasty (AD 253–260) – 
 Gallic Empire (Empire des Gaules) (AD 260–274) – 
 Illyrian emperors (Empereurs illyriens) (AD 274–284) – 
 Caran dynasty (AD 282–285) – 
 Constantinian dynasty (Constantiniens) (AD 305–363) – 
 Valentinianic dynasty (Valentiniens) (AD 364–392) – 
 Theodosian dynasty (Dynastie théodosienne) (AD 392–455) – 
 Kingdom of Soissons (Royaume de Soissons) (AD 457–486) – 
 Merovingian dynasty (Mérovingiens) (AD 509–751)
 Carolingian dynasty (Carolingiens) (AD 751–888, AD 898–922, AD 936–987)
 House of Poitiers (Maison de Poitiers) (AD 854–1204)
 Robertian dynasty (Robertiens) (AD 888–898, AD 922–923)
 Bosonids (Bosonides) (AD 923–936)
 Capetian dynasty (Capétiens) (AD 987–1792, AD 1793–1795, AD 1814–1848)
 House of Capet (Maison capétienne) (AD 987–1328) – 
 House of Valois (Maison capétienne de Valois) (AD 1328–1589)
 House of Valois-Orléans (Le rameau d'Orléans) (AD 1498–1515)
 House of Valois-Angoulême (Le rameau d'Orléans-Angoulême) (AD 1515–1589)
 House of Bourbon (Maison de Bourbon) (AD 1589–1792, AD 1793–1795, AD 1814–1848)
 House of Bourbon-Vendôme (Maison de Bourbon-Vendôme) (AD 1589–1792, AD 1814–1815, AD 1815–1830)
 House of Orléans (Maison d'Orléans) (AD 1830–1848) – 
 House of Lancaster (Maison de Lancastre) (AD 1422–1453) – 
 House of Bonaparte (Maison Bonaparte) (AD 1804–1814, AD 1815, AD 1852–1870)

Germany

 Carolingian dynasty (Karolinger) (AD 843–911)
 Conradines (Konradiner) (AD 911–918)
 Ottonian dynasty (Liudolfinger) (AD 919–921, AD 936–1024)
 Salian dynasty (Salier) (AD 1024–1125) – 
 Supplinburger dynasty (AD 1125–1137)
 Hohenstaufen (Staufer) (AD 1138–1208, AD 1212–1254)
 House of Wizlaw (AD 1168–1325) – 
 House of Welf (Welfen) (AD 1198–1215)
 House of Thuringia (AD 1246–1247)
 House of Holland (AD 1247–1256)
 House of Plantagenet (Haus Plantagenet) (AD 1257–1272)
 House of Ivrea (Haus Burgund-Ivrea) (AD 1257–1275)
 House of Habsburg (Haus Habsburg) (AD 1273–1291, AD 1298–1308, AD 1325–1330, AD 1440–1740)
 House of Nassau (Haus Nassau) (AD 1292–1298)
 House of Luxembourg (Haus Luxemburg) (AD 1308–1313, AD 1346–1400, AD 1410–1437)
 House of Wittelsbach (Haus Wittelsbach) (AD 1314–1347, AD 1400–1410, AD 1742–1745)
 House of Schwarzburg (Schwarzburger) (AD 1349)
 House of Lorraine (Haus Lothringen) (AD 1745–1765)
 House of Habsburg-Lorraine (Habsburg-Lothringen) (AD 1764–1806, AD 1815–1849, AD 1850–1866)
 House of Bonaparte (AD 1806–1813)
 Beauharnais (AD 1813)
 House of Hohenzollern (Haus Hohenzollern) (AD 1525–1918)
 House of Hanover (AD 1807–1890) –

Bavaria
 Agilolfings (Agilolfinger) (AD 548–788)
 Liutpolding Dynasty (Luitpoldinger) (AD 889–947)
 Ottonian Dynasty (Ottonen) (AD 947–1017)
 House of Luxembourg (AD 1017–1026, 1039–1047)
 Salian Dynasty (Salier) (AD 1026–1039, 1053–1061)
 House of Welf (Welfen) (AD 1070–1138, 1156–1180)
 House of Babenberg (AD 1138–1156)
 House of Wittelsbach (AD 1180–1918)

Saxony
 Liudolfing Dynasty (843–961)
 Billung Dynasty (961–1106)
 Supplinburger Dynasty (1106–1127)
 House of Welf (1127–1138, 1142–1180)
 Ascanian Dynasty (1138–1142, 1180–1422)
 Wettin Dynasty (1422–1918)

Georgia

 Pharnavazid dynasty (299–90 BC, 30 BC – 189 AD)
 Artaxiad dynasty of Iberia (90–30 BC)
 Arsacid dynasty of Iberia (189–284 AD)
 Chosroid dynasty (284–580, 627–684)
 Guaramid dynasty (588–627, 684–748, 779–786)
 Nersianid dynasty (748–780)
 Bagrationi dynasty (813–1810)
 House of Dadiani (1183–1857)
 House of Jaqeli (1268–1625)
 House of Shervashidze (1463–1864)
 Safavid dynasty (1510–1736) – 
 House of Mukhrani (1658–1724)
 House of Dadeshkeliani (1720–1857)
 House of Holstein-Gottorp-Romanov (1801-1917)

Greece

 Erechtheid dynasty (1556–1127 BC) – 
 Melanthid dynasty (1126–1068 BC) – 
 Agiad dynasty (930–215 BC) – 
 Eurypontid dynasty (930–206 BC) – 
 Argead dynasty (Ἀργεάδαι) (700–305 BC) – 
 Paeonia Kingdom (Παιονία) (?–511 BC)
 Achaemenid dynasty (511–499 BC, 492–479 BC) – 
 Antigonid dynasty (Ἀντιγονίδαι) (306–286 BC, 276–168 BC) – 
 Antipatrid dynasty (Ἀντιπατρίδαι) (305–294 BC, 279–276 BC) – 
 Mithridatic dynasty (281–37 BC) – 
 Julio–Claudian dynasty (Ιουλιο-Κλαυδιανή δυναστεία) (27 BC–AD 68) – 
 Flavian dynasty (AD 69–96) – 
 Nerva–Antonine dynasty (AD 96–192) – 
 Severan dynasty (AD 193–235) – 
 Gordian dynasty (AD 238–244) – 
 Decian dynasty (AD 249–253) – 
 Valerian dynasty (AD 253–268) – 
 Illyrian emperors (AD 268–284) – 
 Caran dynasty (AD 282–285) – 
 Constantinian dynasty (Δυναστεία του Κωνσταντίνου) (AD 305–363) – 
 Valentinianic dynasty (Δυναστεία του Βαλεντινιανού) (AD 364–379) – 
 Theodosian dynasty (Δυναστεία του Θεοδοσίου) (AD 379–457) – 
 Leonid dynasty (Δυναστεία του Λέοντος) (AD 457–518) – 
 Justinian dynasty (AD 518–602) – 
 Heraclian dynasty (AD 610–711) – 
 Isaurian dynasty (Δυναστεία των Ισαύρων) (AD 717–802) – 
 Nikephorian dynasty (Δυναστεία του Νικηφόρου) (AD 802–813) – 
 Amorian dynasty (AD 820–867) – 
 Emirate of Crete (AD 824–961)
 Macedonian dynasty (Δυναστεία των Μακεδόνων) (AD 867–1056) – 
 Doukid dynasty (Δυναστεία των Δουκών) (AD 1059–1081) – 
 Komnenos dynasty (Δυναστεία των Κομνηνών) (AD 1081–1185) – 
 Angelos dynasty (Οίκος των Αγγέλων) (AD 1185–1204) – 
 House of Flanders (Οίκος της Φλάνδρας) (AD 1204–1216) – 
 Komnenos Doukas dynasty (AD 1205–1318) – 
 Capetian House of Courtenay (AD 1216–1261) – 
 Palaiologos dynasty (Δυναστεία των Παλαιολόγων) (AD 1261–1453) – 
 Orsini dynasty (AD 1318–1337, AD 1356–1359) – 
 House of Barcelona (Οίκος της Βαρκελώνης) (AD 1319–1387) – 
 Nemanjić dynasty (AD 1347–1385) – 
 Losha family (AD 1359–1374) – 
 Spata family (AD 1374–1416) – 
 Buondelmonti dynasty (AD 1385–1411) – 
 Tocco dynasty (AD 1411–1479) – 
 Ottoman dynasty (Οθωμανική Δυναστεία) (AD 1458–1830) – 
 House of Bonaparte (Οικογένεια Βοναπάρτη) (AD 1807–1814) – 
 House of Wittelsbach (Οίκος του Βίττελσμπαχ) (AD 1832–1862) – 
 House of Schleswig-Holstein-Sonderburg-Glücksburg (Οίκος του Σλέσβιχ-Χόλσταϊν-Σόντερμπουργκ-Γκλύξμπουργκ) (AD 1863–1924, AD 1935–1973) –

Hungary

 Hunnic Empire (370s–469)
 Árpád Dynasty (c. 895 – 1301)
 Samuel Aba of Hungary Aba – Árpád Dynasty (1038–1044)
 Přemyslid Dynasty (1301–1305)
 House of Wittelsbach (1305–1308)
 Capetian Dynasty, House of Anjou (1308–1395)
 House of Luxemburg (1387–1437)
 Hunyadi family (1458–1490)
 Habsburg Dynasty (1437–1457, 1526–1918)
 Jagiellonian Dynasty (1440–1526)
 Zápolya Dynasty (1526–1571)

Iceland

 Fairhair dynasty (AD 1262–1319) – 
 House of Bjelbo (AD 1319–1387) – 
 House of Estridsen (AD 1388–1412) – 
 House of Griffin (AD 1412–1442) – 
 House of Palatinate-Neumarkt (AD 1442–1448) – 
 House of Bonde (AD 1449–1450) – 
 House of Oldenburg (AD 1450–1863) – 
 House of Schleswig-Holstein-Sonderburg-Glücksburg (AD 1863–1944) –

Ireland

 MacCarthy (Mac Cárthaigh)
 O'Brien (978–1542)
 O'Conor Don (Ó Conchubhair Donn)
 O'Donnell (Ó Domhnaill)(1200–1601)
 O'Neill (Ó Néill)
 Osraige
 Dál Birn
 Fitzpatrick
 Airgíalla (331–1585)
 Bréifne (700–1256)
 Uí Briúin
 Connachta
 Uí Fiachrach (5th century – 17th century)
 Uí Maine (357–1611)
 Desmumu
 Eóganachta
 Laigin
 Uí Chennselaig
 Mide
 Tuadmumu
 D'Alton
 Dál gCais
 Uí Néill
 Cenél Conaill (Northern)
 Cenél nEógain (Northern)
 Ulaid (before 450 – 1177)
 Dál Fiatach
 De'voy
 Crowley
 Burke
 Clanricarde
 House of Plantagenet (1154–1485)
 Angevin kings of England (1154–1215)
 House of Lancaster (1399–1461 and 1470–1471) (Throne merged with English)

Italy

 Julio–Claudian dynasty (Dinastia giulio-claudia) (27 BC–AD 68) – 
 Flavian dynasty (Dinastia flavia) (AD 69–96) – 
 Nerva–Antonine dynasty (AD 96–192) – 
 Severan dynasty (Dinastia dei Severi) (AD 193–235) – 
 Gordian dynasty (AD 238–244) – 
 Decian dynasty (AD 249–253) – 
 Valerian dynasty (AD 253–268) – 
 Illyrian emperors (Imperatori illirici) (AD 268–284) – 
 Caran dynasty (AD 282–285) – 
 Constantinian dynasty (Dinastia costantiniana) (AD 305–363) – 
 Valentinianic dynasty (Casata di Valentiniano) (AD 364–392) – 
 Theodosian dynasty (Casata di Teodosio) (AD 392–455) – 
 Leonid dynasty (Casata di Leone) (AD 474–476) – 
 Amal dynasty (AD 493–553) – 
 Lething dynasty (Letingi) (c. AD 5th century–546)
 Gausian dynasty (Gausi) (AD 546–572)
 Justinian dynasty (Dinastia giustinianea) (c. AD 555) – 
 Bavarian dynasty (Bavarese) (AD 616–626, AD 653–662, AD 671–712)
 Harodingian dynasty (Arodingi) (AD 636–653)
 Beneventan dynasty (AD 662–671)
 Carolingian dynasty (Carolingi) (AD 774–888)
 Aghlabid dynasty (AD 827–909)
 House of Boniface (AD 812–931)
 Anatolian dynasty (AD 839–866)
 House of Capua (AD 840–866, AD 871–1058)
 House of Spoleto (AD 866–871)
 Docibilan dynasty (AD 866–1032)
 House of Boso (AD 931–1001)
 Aleramici (AD 933–1305)
 Kalbids (Kalbiti) (AD 948–1053)
 House of Musco Comite (AD 958–1039, AD 1052–1073)
 Ottonian dynasty (Dinastia ottoniana) (AD 962–1024)
 House of Hucpold (AD 1004–1011)
 House of Canossa (Casa di Canossa) (AD 1027–1115)
 Salian dynasty (Dinastia salica) (AD 1027–1125)
 House of Salerno (AD 1038–1052)
 Süpplingenburg dynasty (AD 1125–1137)
 Hauteville family (Altavilla) (AD 1071–1198)
 Hohenstaufen (AD 1128–1266)
 Visconti of Pisa and Sardinia (Visconti di Pisa) (AD 1207–1308)
 House of Welf (Welfen) (AD 1208–1212)
 House of Este (Casa d'Este) (AD 1240–1796)
 House of Plantagenet (Plantageneti) (AD 1254–1263) – 
 Capetian dynasty (Capetingi) (AD 1266–1442, AD 1499–1512, AD 1515–1521, AD 1700–1713, AD 1731–1861)
 Capetian House of Anjou (Angioini) (AD 1266–1390, AD 1399–1435)
 House of Valois (Casa di Valois) (AD 1382–1434, AD 1435–1442, AD 1499–1512, AD 1515–1521)
 House of Valois-Anjou (Casa di Valois-Angiò) (AD 1382–1434, AD 1435–1442)
 House of Valois-Orléans (Dinastia Valois-Orléans) (AD 1499–1512)
 House of Valois-Angoulême (Dinastia Valois-Angoulême) (AD 1515–1521)
 House of Bourbon-Anjou (AD 1700–1713, AD 1734–1816)
 House of Bourbon-Parma (Borbone di Parma) (AD 1731–1735, AD 1748–1807, AD 1847–1859)
 House of Bourbon-Two Sicilies (Borbone delle Due Sicilie) (AD 1735–1861)
 House of Barcelona (Casa di Barcellona) (AD 1282–1410)
 Palaiologos dynasty (Paleologi) (AD 1306–1533)
 House of Luxembourg (Casata di Lussemburgo) (AD 1311–1313, AD 1355–1437)
 House of Wittelsbach (Casato di Wittelsbach) (AD 1327–1347)
 House of Gonzaga (AD 1328–1708)
 Albizzi family (AD 1382–1434)
 Visconti of Milan (AD 1395–1447)
 House of Trastámara (Casa de Trastámara) (AD 1412–1516, AD 1442–1501, AD 1504–1516)
 House of Medici (AD 1434–1494, AD 1512–1737)
 House of Habsburg (Casa d'Asburgo) (AD 1437–1780)
 House of Habsburg-Lorraine (Asburgo-Lorena) (AD 1737–1801, AD 1814–1860, AD 1780–1796)
 House of Sforza (Famiglia Sforza) (AD 1450–1499, AD 1513–1515, AD 1522–1535)
 House of Farnese (AD 1545–1731)
 House of Guise (Casa di Guisa) (AD 1647–1648)
 House of Bonaparte (AD 1805–1814)
 House of Murat (Casa Murat) (AD 1808–1815)
 House of Savoy (Casa Savoia) (AD 1713–1720, AD 1762–1799, AD 1831–1946)
 House of Savoy-Carignano (AD 1831–1946)

Liechtenstein

  (1608–present)

Lithuania

 Palemonids 
 House of Mindaugas 
 Gediminids 
 Family of Gediminas
House of Jagiellon
 House of Palatinate-Zweibrücken (1655–1657) –

Luxembourg

 House of Luxembourg (AD 963–1136)
 House of Luxembourg-Namur (AD 1136–1196, AD 1197–1226)
 House of Luxembourg-Limburg (AD 1247–1425)
 Hohenstaufen (AD 1196–1197)
 House of Valois-Burgundy (AD 1443–1482)
 House of Habsburg (AD 1482–1700, AD 1713–1780)
 House of Habsburg-Lorraine (AD 1740–1794)
 House of Bourbon (AD 1700–1712)
  (AD 1985–present)
  (AD 1890–present)
  (AD 1890–present)
 House of Wittelsbach (AD 1712–1713)
 House of Orange-Nassau (AD 1815–1890)

Malta

 Julio–Claudian dynasty (27 BC–AD 68) – 
 Flavian dynasty (AD 69–96) – 
 Nerva–Antonine dynasty (AD 96–192) – 
 Severan dynasty (AD 193–235) – 
 Gordian dynasty (AD 238–244) – 
 Decian dynasty (AD 249–253) – 
 Valerian dynasty (AD 253–268) – 
 Illyrian emperors (AD 268–284) – 
 Caran dynasty (AD 282–285) – 
 Constantinian dynasty (AD 305–363) – 
 Valentinianic dynasty (AD 364–392) – 
 Theodosian dynasty (AD 379–457) – 
 Leonid dynasty (AD 457–518) – 
 Justinian dynasty (AD 535–602) – 
 Heraclian dynasty (AD 610–711) – 
 Isaurian dynasty (AD 717–802) – 
 Nikephorian dynasty (AD 802–813) – 
 Amorian dynasty (AD 820–867) – 
 Macedonian dynasty (AD 867–870) – 
 Aghlabid dynasty (AD 870–909)
 Fatimid dynasty (AD 909–1127) – 
 Hauteville family (AD 1127–1198)
 Hohenstaufen (AD 1194–1266)
 House of Plantagenet (AD 1254–1263) – 
 Capetian House of Anjou (AD 1266–1282)
 House of Barcelona (AD 1282–1410)
 House of Trastámara (AD 1412–1516)
 House of Habsburg (AD 1516–1530)
 House of Bourbon-Two Sicilies (AD 1798–1801) – 
 House of Hanover (AD 1813–1901) – 
 House of Saxe-Coburg and Gotha (AD 1901–1917) – 
 House of Windsor (AD 1917–1974) –

Monaco

  (Maison Grimaldi) (1297–present)

Montenegro

 Julio–Claudian dynasty (27 BC–AD 68) – 
 Flavian dynasty (AD 69–96) – 
 Nerva–Antonine dynasty (AD 96–192) – 
 Severan dynasty (AD 193–235) – 
 Gordian dynasty (AD 238–244) – 
 Decian dynasty (AD 249–253) – 
 Valerian dynasty (AD 253–268) – 
 Illyrian emperors (AD 268–284) – 
 Caran dynasty (AD 282–285) – 
 Constantinian dynasty (AD 305–363) – 
 Valentinianic dynasty (AD 364–379) – 
 Theodosian dynasty (AD 379–457) – 
 Leonid dynasty (AD 457–518) – 
 Justinian dynasty (AD 518–600) – 
 Vojislavljević dynasty (AD 1018–1043, AD 1050–1186)
 Crnojević noble family (AD 1326–1362, AD 1431–1498)
 Balšić noble family (AD 1356–1421)
 Lazarević dynasty (AD 1421–1427)
 Branković dynasty (AD 1427–1456)
 Ottoman dynasty (AD 1498–1878, AD 1909–1912) – 
  (Петровић-Његош) (AD 1696–1918) – 
 House of Habsburg-Lorraine (AD 1878–1909) – 
 Karađorđević dynasty (AD 1918–1941) – 
 House of Savoy (AD 1941–1943) –

The Netherlands

  (Huis Nassau) (AD 1544–present)
  (Huis Oranje-Nassau) (AD 1813–present)
 House of Bonaparte (AD 1806–1810) –

Norway

 Fairhair dynasty (Hårfagreætta) (AD 872–970, AD 995–1000)
 Saint Olaf dynasty (AD 1015–1028, AD 1035–1047)
 Hardrada dynasty (Hardrådeætta) (AD 1046–1135, AD 1161–1184)
 Gille dynasty (AD 1130–1162, AD 1204–1217)
 House of Sverre (Sverreætten) (AD 1184–1204, AD 1217–1319)
 House of Knýtlinga (AD 961–995, AD 1000–1015, AD 1028–1035) – 
 House of Estridsen (AD 1380–1412)
 House of Bjelbo (AD 1319–1387)
 House of Griffin (AD 1389–1442)
 House of Palatinate-Neumarkt (AD 1442–1448)
 House of Bonde (AD 1449–1450)
 House of Oldenburg (AD 1450–1814)
 House of Holstein-Gottorp (AD 1814–1818)
  (AD 1905–present)
 House of Bernadotte (AD 1818–1905)

Poland

 Piast dynasty (9th century-1296 and 1306–1370)
 House of Sobiesław (1227–1262)
 Přemyslid dynasty (1291–1306)
 Capetian dynasty, House of Anjou (1370–1399)
 Jagiellonian dynasty (1386–1572 and 1575–1586)
 House of Valois (1573–1574)
 House of Báthory (1576–1586)
 House of Vasa (1587–1668)
 House of Wiśniowiecki (1669–1673)
 House of Sobieski (1674–1696)
 Wettin Dynasty (1697–1706, 1709–1733 and 1736–1764)
 House of Leszczyński (1704–1709 and 1733–1736)
 House of Poniatowski (1764–1795)

Portugal

 Banu Sabur (1022–1034) – 
 Labidid dynasty (1144–1145) –

County of Portugal
 House of Vímara Peres (868–1071)
 Portuguese House of Burgundy (1093–1139)

Kingdom of Portugal
 Portuguese House of Burgundy or Afonsine dynasty (1139–1383)
 House of Aviz or Joannine dynasty (1385–1580)
 Aviz (direct) (1385–1495)
 Aviz-Beja (1495–1580)
 Most Serene House of Braganza or Brigantine dynasty (1640–1910)
 Braganza (direct) (1640–1853)
 Braganza-Saxe-Coburg and Gotha (1853–1910)
 House of Habsburg or Philippine Dynasty (1581–1640)

Roman Empire

 Julio–Claudian dynasty (27 BC–AD 68)
 Flavian dynasty (AD 69–96)
 Nerva–Antonine dynasty (AD 96–192)
 Nerva–Trajan dynasty (AD 96–138)
 Antonine dynasty (AD 138–192)
 Severan dynasty (AD 193–235)
 Gordian dynasty (AD 238–244)
 Decian dynasty (AD 249–253)
 Valerian dynasty (AD 253–268)
 House of Odaenathus (AD 270–273) – 
 Caran dynasty (AD 282–285)
 Constantinian dynasty (AD 305–363) – 
 Valentinianic dynasty (AD 364–392) – 
 Theodosian dynasty (AD 379–457) – 
 Kingdom of Soissons (AD 457–486) – 
 Leonid dynasty (AD 457–518) – 
 Justinian dynasty (AD 518–602) – 
 Heraclian dynasty (AD 610–711) – 
 Isaurian dynasty (AD 717–802) – 
 Nikephorian dynasty (AD 802–813) – 
 Amorian dynasty (AD 820–867) – 
 Macedonian dynasty (AD 867–1056) – 
 Doukid dynasty (AD 1059–1081) – 
 Komnenos dynasty (AD 1081–1185) – 
 Angelos dynasty (AD 1185–1204) – 
 Laskarid dynasty (AD 1204–1261) – 
 Palaiologos dynasty (AD 1261–1453) –

Romania

Moldavia
 Hunnic Empire (370s–469)
 House of Dragoș (1345–1364)
 House of Bogdan-Mușat 
 Movilești
 House of Drăculești
 House of Rossetti
 Ghica family
 Cantacuzino family
 Cantemirești
 Racoviță
 Mavrocordatos family
 Ypsilantis
 Soutzos family
 Mourousis family
 House of Cuza

Wallachia
 House of Basarab
 House of Bogdan-Mușat 
 Movilești
 House of Drăculești
 House of Rossetti
 Ghica family
 Cantacuzino family
 Cantemirești
 Racoviță
 Mavrocordatos family
 Ypsilantis
 Soutzos family
 Mourousis family
 House of Cuza

After the Unification
 House of Hohenzollern-Sigmaringen (1866–1947)

European Russia

 Khazar Khaganate (Хазары) (AD 650–969)
 Volga Bulgaria (Волжская Булгария) (AD 7th century–1242)
 Rus' Khaganate (Русский каганат) (AD 8th century–9th century) – 
 Kyi dynasty (AD 842–882)
 Rurik dynasty (Рю́риковичи) (AD 862–1598, AD 1605–1610)
 House of Shuysky (Шуйские) (AD 1606–1610)
 Golden Horde (Золотая Орда) (AD 1242–1502) – 
 Khanate of Kazan (Казанское ханство) (AD 1438–1552)
 Qasim Khanate (Касимовское царство) (AD 1452–1681)
 Great Horde (Большая Орда) (AD 1466–1502)
 Astrakhan Khanate (Астраханское ханство) (AD 1466–1556)
 Qasim dynasty (AD 1575–1576)
 Godunov dynasty (Годуно́в) (AD 1598–1605)
 House of Vasa (Васа) (AD 1610–1613, AD 1634–1654) – 
 House of Romanov (Рома́новы) (AD 1613–1762, AD 1796–1917, AD 1922)
 House of Holstein-Gottorp-Romanov (Ветвь Гольштейн-Готторп-Романовская) (AD 1762, AD 1796–1917, AD 1922)
 Kalmyk Khanate (Калмыцкое ханство) (AD 1630–1771)
 House of Palatinate-Zweibrücken (AD 1654–1720) – 
 House of Hesse (AD 1720–1721) – 
 House of Ascania (Аскании) (AD 1762–1796)

Scotland

 Flavian dynasty (AD 71–96) – 
 Nerva–Antonine dynasty (AD 96–192) – 
 Severan dynasty (AD 193–211) – 
 Fairhair dynasty (AD 872–970, AD 995–1000) – 
 Saint Olaf dynasty (AD 1015–1028, AD 1035–1047) – 
 Hardrada dynasty (AD 1046–1135, AD 1161–1184) – 
 Gille dynasty (AD 1130–1162, AD 1204–1217) – 
 House of Sverre (AD 1184–1204, AD 1217–1319) – 
 House of Alpin (AD 843–1034)
 Uí Ímair (AD 9th century–10th century) – 
 House of Knýtlinga (AD 961–995, AD 1000–1015, AD 1028–1035) – 
 House of Estridsen (AD 1380–1412) – 
 House of Dunkeld (AD 1034–1040, AD 1058–1286)
 House of Moray (AD 1040–1058)
 House of Sverre (AD 1286–1290)
 House of Balliol (AD 1292–1296, AD 1332–1336)
 Clan Bruce (AD 1306–1371)
 House of Bjelbo (AD 1319–1387) – 
 House of Stuart (AD 1371–1651, AD 1660–1714) – 
 House of Griffin (AD 1389–1442) – 
 House of Palatinate-Neumarkt (AD 1442–1448) – 
 House of Bonde (AD 1449–1450) – 
 House of Oldenburg (AD 1450–1470) – 
 House of Hanover (AD 1714–1901) – 
 House of Saxe-Coburg and Gotha (AD 1901–1917) – 
  (AD 1917–present) –

Serbia

 Vlastimirović dynasty (610–960)
 Vojislavljević dynasty (1034–1186)
 Vukanović dynasty (1083–1166)
 Nemanjić dynasty (1166–1371)
 Lazarević dynasty (1371–1427)
 Branković dynasty (1427–1502)
 Karađorđević dynasty (1811–13, 1842–58 and 1903–41)
 Obrenović dynasty (1815–42 and 1858–1903)

Spain

 Julio–Claudian dynasty (27 BC–AD 68) – 
 Flavian dynasty (AD 69–96) – 
 Nerva–Antonine dynasty (AD 96–192) – 
 Severan dynasty (AD 193–235) – 
 Gordian dynasty (AD 238–244) – 
 Decian dynasty (AD 249–253) – 
 Valerian dynasty (AD 253–268) – 
 Constantinian dynasty (AD 305–363) – 
 Valentinianic dynasty (AD 364–392) – 
 Theodosian dynasty (AD 379–409) – 
 Balt dynasty (AD 395–531) – 
 Umayyad dynasty (AD 711–750, AD 756–1017, AD 1023–1031) – 
 Astur-Leonese dynasty (AD 718–1037) – 
 Banu Salama (AD 780–800)
 Banu Shabrit (AD 8th century–10th century)
 Banu Khalaf (AD 802–882)
 House of Íñiguez (AD 824–905) – 
 Banu Qasi (AD 9th century–10th century)
 Jiménez dynasty (AD 905–1234) – 
 Banu Sabur (AD 1009–1022) – 
 Qasimid dynasty (AD 1009–1106) – 
 Ya'isid dynasty (AD 1010–?, ?–AD 1031) – 
 Masarrid dynasty – 
 Banu Qantir – 
 Saqlabi dynasty (AD 1010–1060) – 
 Dammarid dynasty (AD 1010–1066) – 
 Amirid dynasty (AD 1010–1086, AD 1224–1227) – 
 Jizrunid dynasty (AD 1011–1069) – 
 Bakrid dynasty (AD 1012–1051) – 
 Banu Razin (AD 1012–1104) – 
 Birzalid dynasty (AD 1013–1067) – 
 Zirid dynasty (AD 1013–1090) – 
 Harunid dynasty (AD 1018–1051) – 
 Mujahid dynasty (AD 1018–1075) – 
 Matiyid dynasty (AD 1020–1028) – 
 Banu Tujib (AD 1013–1094) – 
 Banu Sumadih (AD 1041–1091) – 
 Hammudid dynasty (AD 1016–1023, AD 1026–1058) – 
 Aftasid dynasty (AD 1022–1094)
 Yahsubid dynasty (AD 1023–1054) – 
 Abbadid dynasty (AD 1023–1091) – 
 Muzaymid dynasty (AD 1027–1063) – 
 Banu Jawhar (AD 1031–1091) – 
 Dhulnunid dynasty (AD 1032–1080, AD 1081–1085, AD 1086–1092) – 
 Yafranid dynasty (AD 1039–1065) – 
 Banu Hud (AD 1039–1131, AD 1145, AD 1146) – 
 Aglabid dynasty (AD 1076–1126) – 
 Lubbunid dynasty (AD 1086–1092) – 
 Galbunid dynasty (AD 1080s–1100) – 
 Almoravid dynasty (AD 1090–1145) – 
 Yahhafid dynasty (AD 1092–1094) – 
 Dynasty of El Cid (AD 1094–1102) – 
 Banu Hayy (AD 1116–1150) – 
 Ghaniyid dynasty (AD 1126–1203) – 
 Castilian House of Burgundy (AD 1111–1369) – 
 Banu Wazir (AD 1142–1145) – 
 Idrisid dynasty (AD 1143–1145) – 
 Darddusid dynasty (AD 1143–1150) – 
 Marwanid dynasty (AD 1143–1150) – 
 Qasid dynasty (AD 1144–1145, AD 1146–1151) – 
 'Abd al-'Aziz dynasty (AD 1145) – 
 Yuzaid dynasty (AD 1145) – 
 Taifa of Jerez (AD 1145)
 'Jyaddid dynasty (AD 1145–1146, AD 1146–1147) – 
 al-Mundirid dynasty (AD 1145–1150) – 
 Bitruyid dynasty (AD 1145–1150) – 
 Miqdamid dynasty (AD 1145–1150) – 
 Malyanid dynasty (AD 1145–1151) – 
 Hassunid dynasty (AD 1145–1153) – 
 'Umarid dynasty (AD 1146–1150) – 
 Hamuskid dynasty (AD 1147–1150, AD 1168) – 
 House of Barcelona (AD 1164–1410) – 
 Bayasid dynasty (AD 1224–1226) – 
 Ahlid dynasty (AD 1228–1250) – 
 Hakamid dynasty (AD 1228–1287) – 
 Mardanis dynasty (AD 1229–1238) – 
 Zannunid dynasty (AD 1229–1239) – 
 Nasrid dynasty (AD 1230–1492) – 
 Mahfuzid dynasty (AD 1234–1262) – 
 House of Blois (AD 1234–1284) – 
 Taifa of Orihuela (AD 1239–1249)
 Capetian dynasty (AD 1284–1441) – 
 House of Capet (AD 1284–1349)
 House of Évreux (AD 1328–1441)
 House of Trastámara (AD 1369–1555) – 
 House of Foix (AD 1479–1517) – 
 House of Albret (AD 1484–1513, AD 1513–1572) – 
 House of Habsburg (AD 1504–1700, AD 1705–1714) – 
 House of Bourbon (AD 1572–1620, AD 1700–1868)
 House of Bourbon-Vendôme (AD 1572–1620) – 
  (AD 1700–1833, AD 1874–1931, AD 1975–present)
 House of Bonaparte (AD 1808–1813)
 House of Savoy (AD 1870–1873)

Sweden

 House of Munsö (c. AD 970–1060)
 House of Stenkil (AD 1060–1126)
 House of Estridsen (AD 1126–1132, AD 1160–1161, AD 1388/1389–1412)
 House of Sverker (AD 1130–1156, AD 1161–1167, AD 1196–1208, AD 1216–1222)
 House of Eric (Erikska ätten) (AD 1156–1160, AD 1167–1196, AD 1208–1216, AD 1222–1250)
 House of Bjelbo (Bjälboätten) (AD 1250–1364)
 House of Mecklenburg (AD 1364–1389)
 House of Griffin (AD 1396–1439)
 House of Wittelsbach (Huset Wittelsbach) (AD 1441–1448, AD 1654–1720)
 House of Palatinate-Neumarkt (AD 1441–1448)
 House of Palatinate-Zweibrücken (AD 1654–1720)
 House of Bonde (AD 1448–1457, AD 1464–1465, AD 1467–1470)
 House of Oldenburg (AD 1457–1464, AD 1497–1501, AD 1520–1521/1523)
 House of Holstein-Gottorp (AD 1751–1818)
 House of Vasa (AD 1523–1654)
 House of Hesse (AD 1720–1751)
  (AD 1818–present)

Ukraine

 Hunnic Empire (AD 370s–469)
 Dulo clan (Дуло) (AD 632–668) – 
 Khazar Khaganate (Хозари) (c. AD 650–969)
 Rus' Khaganate (Руський Каганат) (AD 8th century–9th century) – 
 Pecheneg Khanates (Печеніги) (AD 860–1091)
 Rurik dynasty (Рюриковичі) (AD 890–1323) – 
 Golden Horde (Золота Орда) (AD 1242–1502) – 
 Piast dynasty (П'ясти) (AD 1323–1340) – 
 Gediminid dynasty (Гедиміновичі) (AD 1340–1349) – 
 Giray dynasty (Ґіреї) (AD 1427–1783) – 
 Jagiellonian dynasty (Ягеллони) (AD 1569–1572, AD 1575–1586) – 
 House of Valois (Валуа) (AD 1574–1575) – 
 Báthory family (Баторії) (AD 1575–1586) – 
 House of Vasa (Ваза) (AD 1587–1668) – 
 Khmelnytsky (AD 1648–1663, AD 1678–1681)
 Wiśniowiecki (Вишневецькі) (AD 1669–1673) – 
 House of Sobieski (Собеські) (AD 1674–1696) – 
 House of Wettin (Веттіни) (AD 1697–1706, AD 1709–1733, AD 1734–1763) – 
 Leszczyński (Лещинський) (AD 1705–1709, AD 1733–1736) – 
 Skoropadsky family (Скоропадські) (AD 1708–1722, AD 1918)
 Poniatowski (Понятовські) (AD 1764–1795) – 
 House of Habsburg (Габсбурги) (AD 1772–1780) – 
 House of Habsburg-Lorraine (Габсбурги-Лотаринзькі) (AD 1780–1918)
 House of Ascania (Асканії) (AD 1772–1796) – 
 House of Holstein-Gottorp-Romanov (Гольштейн-Готторп-Романовы) (AD 1796–1917) –

Wales

 Julio–Claudian dynasty (AD 43–68) – 
 Flavian dynasty (AD 69–96) – 
 Nerva–Antonine dynasty (AD 96–192) – 
 Severan dynasty (AD 193–235) – 
 Gordian dynasty (AD 238–244) – 
 Decian dynasty (AD 249–253) – 
 Valerian dynasty (AD 253–260) – 
 Gallic Empire (AD 260–274) – 
 Illyrian emperors (AD 274–284) – 
 Caran dynasty (AD 282–285) – 
 Constantinian dynasty (AD 305–363) – 
 Valentinianic dynasty (AD 364–392) – 
 Theodosian dynasty (AD 392–410) – 
 House of Gwynedd
 House of Cunedda
 House of Manaw
 House of Aberffraw
 House of Dinefwr
 House of Mathrafal
 House of Morgannwg
 House of Rhuddlan
 House of Tudor (AD 1535–1603) – 
 House of Stuart (AD 1603–1649, AD 1660–1714) – 
 House of Hanover (AD 1714–1901) – 
 House of Saxe-Coburg and Gotha (AD 1901–1917) – 
  (AD 1917–present) –

List of dynasties in North America

 Powhatan Chiefdom (?–1646)
 Sachem (?–1676)
 Iroquois Confederacy (1142–present)
 Hunkpapa Seven council fires (?–1872)

Alaska
 House of Holstein-Gottorp-Romanov (AD 1799–1867) – 
 Imperial House of Japan (AD 1942–1943) –

Antigua and Barbuda

 House of Stuart (AD 1632–1649, AD 1660–1714) – 
 House of Hanover (AD 1714–1901) – 
 House of Saxe-Coburg and Gotha (AD 1901–1917) – 
  (AD 1917–present) –

The Bahamas

 House of Hanover (AD 1718–1782, AD 1783–1901) – 
 House of Saxe-Coburg and Gotha (AD 1901–1917) – 
  (AD 1917–present) –

Barbados

 House of Stuart (AD 1625–1649, AD 1660–1714) – 
 House of Hanover (AD 1714–1901) – 
 House of Saxe-Coburg and Gotha (AD 1901–1917) – 
 House of Windsor (AD 1917–2021) –

Belize

 House of Iturbide (AD 1822–1823) – 
 House of Hanover (AD 1862–1901) – 
 House of Saxe-Coburg and Gotha (AD 1901–1917) – 
  (AD 1917–present) –

Bermuda
 House of Stuart (AD 1609–1649, AD 1660–1714) – 
 House of Hanover (AD 1714–1901) – 
 House of Saxe-Coburg and Gotha (AD 1901–1917) – 
  (AD 1917–present) –

Canada

 Capetian dynasty (AD 1534–1763) – 
 House of Valois-Angoulême (AD 1534–1589) – 
 House of Bourbon-Vendôme (AD 1589–1763) – 
 House of Hanover (AD 1763–1901) – 
 House of Bourbon-Anjou (AD 1789–1795) – 
 House of Saxe-Coburg and Gotha (AD 1901–1917) – 
  (AD 1917–present) – 
 House of Schleswig-Holstein-Sonderburg-Glücksburg (AD 1928–1930) –

Costa Rica
 House of Trastámara (AD 1524–1555) – 
 House of Habsburg (AD 1516–1700) – 
 House of Bourbon-Anjou (AD 1700–1808, AD 1813–1821) – 
 House of Bonaparte (AD 1808–1813) – 
 House of Iturbide (AD 1822–1823) –

Cuba
 House of Trastámara (Casa de Trastámara) (AD 1511–1555) – 
 House of Habsburg (Casa de Habsburgo) (AD 1516–1700) – 
 House of Bourbon-Anjou (Casa de Borbón-Anjou) (AD 1700–1808, AD 1813–1868, AD 1874–1898) – 
 House of Bonaparte (Casa de Bonaparte) (AD 1808–1813) – 
 House of Savoy (Casa de Saboya) (AD 1870–1873) –

Dominica
 House of Bourbon-Vendôme (AD 1715–1763, AD 1778–1783) – 
 House of Hanover (AD 1763–1778, AD 1783–1901) – 
 House of Saxe-Coburg and Gotha (AD 1901–1917) – 
 House of Windsor (AD 1917–1978) –

El Salvador
 Cuzcatlan (1054–1528)
House of Trastámara (Casa de Trastámara) (AD 1511–1555) – 
House of Habsburg (Casa de Habsburgo) (AD 1516–1700) – 
House of Bourbon-Anjou (Casa de Borbón-Anjou) (AD 1700–1808, AD 1813–1821) – 
House of Bonaparte (Casa de Bonaparte) (AD 1808–1813) – 
House of Iturbide (Casa de Iturbide) (AD 1822–1823) –

Greenland
 House of Sverre (AD 1261–1319) – 
 House of Bjelbo (AD 1319–1387) – 
 House of Estridsen (AD 1387–1412) – 
 House of Griffin (AD 1412–1442) – 
 House of Palatinate-Neumarkt (AD 1442–1448) – 
 House of Bonde (AD 1449–1450) – 
 House of Oldenburg (AD 1450–1863) – 
  (AD 1863–present) –

Grenada
 House of Bourbon-Vendôme (AD 1649–1763) – 
 House of Hanover (AD 1763–1901) – 
 House of Saxe-Coburg and Gotha (AD 1901–1917) – 
  (AD 1917–present) –

Haiti

 House of Trastámara (AD 1492–1555) – 
 House of Habsburg (AD 1516–1625) – 
 House of Bourbon-Vendôme (AD 1625–1792) – 
 First Empire of Haiti (AD 1804–1806)
 Kingdom of Haiti (AD 1811–1820)
 Second Empire of Haiti (AD 1849–1859)

Honduras 

 House of Trastámara (Casa de Trastámara) (AD 1502–1555) – Honduras under Spanish rule
 House of Habsburg (Casa de Habsburgo) (AD 1516–1700) – Honduras under Spanish rule
 House of Bourbon-Anjou (Casa de Borbón-Anjou) (AD 1700–1808, AD 1813–1821) – Honduras under Spanish rule
 House of Bonaparte (Casa de Bonaparte) (AD 1808–1813) – Honduras under Spanish rule
 House of Iturbide (Casa de Iturbide) (AD 1822–1823) – Honduras under Mexican rule
 House of Hanover (Casa de Hanover) (AD 1852-1860) – British occupation of the Bay Islands

Jamaica

 House of Trastámara (AD 1509–1555) – 
 House of Habsburg (AD 1516–1655) – 
 House of Stuart (AD 1655–1714) – 
 House of Hanover (AD 1714–1901) – 
 House of Saxe-Coburg and Gotha (AD 1901–1917) – 
  (AD 1917–present) –

Maya
 Chan Santa Cruz Maya free State of Quintana Roo, Mexico (1850–1893)
 Itza Elite Yucatan, Mexico (600–1697)
 Kan Ek' Nojpetén Itza kingship, Guatemala (700–1697)
 Yax Kuk Mo Dynasty, Honduras (426 AC–810)
 K'iche' Kingdom of Q'umarkaj, Guatemala (1225–1524)
 Palenque B'aak dynasty Chiapas, Mexico(967 BCE – 799 CE)
 Siyaj K'ak' dynasties Mexico, Guatemala and Honduras (378–869)

Mexico

 Altepetl of Tetzcoco (AD 1298–1564)
 Purépecha Empire (AD 1300–1530)
 Altepetl of Tenochtitlan (AD 1325–1525, AD 1538–1565)
 Altepetl of Tlatelolco (AD 1403–1579)
 House of Trastámara (AD 1511–1555) – 
 House of Habsburg (AD 1516–1700) – 
 House of Bourbon-Anjou (AD 1700–1808, AD 1813–1821) – 
 House of Bonaparte (AD 1808–1813) – 
 House of Iturbide (AD 1822–1823) – 
 House of Habsburg-Lorraine (AD 1864–1867) –

Panama
 House of Trastámara (AD 1538–1555) – 
 House of Habsburg (AD 1516–1700) – 
 House of Stuart (AD 1698–1700) – 
 House of Bourbon-Anjou (AD 1700–1808, AD 1813–1821) – 
 House of Bonaparte (AD 1808–1813) –

Saint Kitts and Nevis

  (AD 1917–present) –

Saint Lucia

  (AD 1917–present) –

Saint Vincent and the Grenadines

 House of Bourbon-Vendôme (AD 1719–1763, AD 1779–1783) – 
 House of Hanover (AD 1763–1779, AD 1783–1901) – 
 House of Saxe-Coburg and Gotha (AD 1901–1917) – 
  (AD 1917–present) –

Trinidad and Tobago
 House of Trastámara (AD 1498–1555) – 
 House of Habsburg (AD 1516–1700) – 
 House of Ketteler (AD 1654–1659) – 
 House of Bourbon-Anjou (AD 1700–1797) – 
 House of Hanover (AD 1763–1781, AD 1793–1901) – 
 House of Saxe-Coburg and Gotha (AD 1901–1917) – 
 House of Windsor (AD 1917–1976) –

Conterminous United States
 Capetian dynasty (AD 1534–1808, AD 1813–1821)
 House of Valois-Angoulême (AD 1534–1589) – 
 House of Bourbon (AD 1589–1808, AD 1813–1821)
 House of Bourbon-Vendôme (AD 1589–1763) – 
 House of Bourbon-Anjou (AD 1700–1808, AD 1813–1821) – 
 House of Habsburg (AD 1535–1700) – 
 House of Stuart (AD 1607–1649, AD 1660–1714) – 
 House of Nassau (AD 1614–1667, AD 1673–1674) – 
 House of Vasa (AD 1638–1654) – 
 House of Palatinate-Zweibrücken (AD 1654–1655) – 
 House of Hanover (AD 1714–1783, AD 1813–1821) – 
  (AD 1718–present) – 
 House of Bonaparte (AD 1808–1813) – 
 House of Holstein-Gottorp-Romanov (AD 1812–1841) – 
 House of Iturbide (AD 1821–1823) –

Virgin Islands
 House of Trastámara (AD 1493–1555) – 
 House of Habsburg (AD 1516–1700) – 
 House of Stuart (AD 1672–1714) – 
 House of Oldenburg (AD 1672–1863) – 
 House of Schleswig-Holstein-Sonderburg-Glücksburg (AD 1863–1917) – 
 House of Bourbon-Anjou (AD 1700–1808, AD 1813–1868, AD 1874–1898) – 
 House of Hanover (AD 1714–1901) – 
 House of Bonaparte (AD 1808–1813) – 
 House of Savoy (AD 1870–1873) – 
 House of Saxe-Coburg and Gotha (AD 1901–1917) – 
  (AD 1917–present) –

List of dynasties in Oceania

Australia

 House of Hanover (AD 1788–1901) – 
  (AD 1942–present) –

Cocos (Keeling) Islands
 Clunies-Ross family (AD 1827–1978)
 House of Hanover (AD 1857–1901) – 
 House of Saxe-Coburg and Gotha (AD 1901–1917) – 
  (AD 1917–present) –

Cook Islands

 House of Hanover (AD 1900–1901) – 
 House of Saxe-Coburg and Gotha (AD 1901–1917) – 
  (AD 1917–present) –

Easter Island
 Miru dynasty (?–AD 1899) –

Fiji

 Kingdom of Fiji (AD 1871–1874)
 House of Hanover (AD 1874–1901) – 
 House of Saxe-Coburg and Gotha (AD 1901–1917) – 
 House of Windsor (AD 1917–1987) –

Gambier Islands

 Kingdom of Mangareva (?–AD 1881)

Hawaii

 Pili line (Hale o Pili) (?–AD 1695)
 House of Keawe (Hale o Keawe) (AD 1695–?)
 House of Keōua Nui (Hale o Keōua Nui)
 House of Kamehameha (Hale o Kamehameha) (c. AD 1795–1872)
 House of Laʻanui (Hale o Laʻanui) – 
 House of Kalākaua (c. AD 1874–1893)
 House of Kawānanakoa – 
 House of Holstein-Gottorp-Romanov (AD 1814–1817) – 
 House of Hanover (AD 1843) –

Kiribati
 House of Saxe-Coburg and Gotha (AD 1916–1917) – 
 House of Windsor (AD 1917–1942, AD 1945–1979) –

Micronesia
 Saudeleur dynasty (c. AD 1100–1628)
 Imperial House of Japan (AD 1919–1947) –

Nauru
 House of Hohenzollern (AD 1886–1914) – 
 House of Saxe-Coburg and Gotha (AD 1914–1917) – 
 House of Windsor (AD 1917–1942, AD 1945–1968) – 
 Imperial House of Japan (AD 1942–1945) –

New Zealand

 House of Hanover (AD 1840–1901) – 
  (AD 1858–present) – 
 House of Saxe-Coburg and Gotha (AD 1901–1917) – 
  (AD 1917–present) –

Niue
 House of Hanover (AD 1901) – 
 House of Saxe-Coburg and Gotha (AD 1901–1917) – 
  (AD 1917–present) –

Palau
 House of Bourbon-Anjou (AD 1885–1899) – 
 House of Hohenzollern (AD 1899–1914) – 
 Imperial House of Japan (AD 1914–1944) –

Papua New Guinea
 House of Hohenzollern (AD 1884–1919) – 
 House of Hanover (AD 1888–1901) – 
 House of Saxe-Coburg and Gotha (AD 1901–1902) – 
  (AD 1945–present) –

Samoan Islands
 House of Hohenzollern (AD 1900–1914) – 
 House of Saxe-Coburg and Gotha (AD 1914–1917) – 
 House of Windsor (AD 1917–1962) – 
 Tui Manu'a Confederacy (?–?)

Society Islands

 House of Tapoa (AD 1778–1873) – 
 Pōmare dynasty (AD 1788–1808, AD 1815–1895) – 
 House of Tamatoa (AD 1820–1884, AD 1888–1897) – 
 House of Teururai (AD 1852–1895) –

Solomon Islands

 House of Hanover (AD 1893–1901) – 
 House of Saxe-Coburg and Gotha (AD 1901–1917) – 
  (AD 1917–1942, AD 1942–present) –

Tokelau
 House of Hanover (AD 1877–1901) – 
 House of Saxe-Coburg and Gotha (AD 1901–1917) – 
  (AD 1917–present) –

Tonga

 Tuʻi Tonga (c. AD 900–1865)
 Tuʻi Haʻatakalaua (c. AD 1470–1797)
  (AD 1845–present)

Tuvalu

 House of Hanover (AD 1892–1901) – 
 House of Saxe-Coburg and Gotha (AD 1901–1917) – 
  (AD 1917–present) –

Vanuatu
 House of Saxe-Coburg and Gotha (AD 1906–1917) – 
 House of Windsor (AD 1917–1980) –

List of dynasties in South America

Argentina
 House of Habsburg (Casa de Habsburgo) (AD 1534–1700) – 
 House of Bourbon-Anjou (Casa de Borbón-Anjou) (AD 1700–1808, AD 1813–1816) – 
 House of Bonaparte (Casa de Bonaparte) (AD 1808–1813) –

Bolivia
  (AD 1823–present)

Brazil

 House of Aviz (Dinastia de Avis) (AD 1500–1580) – 
 House of Aviz-Beja (AD 1500–1580) – 
 House of Braganza (Sereníssima Casa de Bragança) (AD 1640–1910) – 
 House of Braganza-Saxe-Coburg and Gotha (AD 1853–1910)
 House of Orléans-Braganza (Casa de Orléans e Bragança) – 
 House of Valois-Angoulême (AD 1555–1567) – 
 Philippine dynasty (Dinastia filipina) (AD 1580–1640) – 
 Quilombo dos Palmares (AD 1670–1695)

Chile
 House of Habsburg (Casa de Habsburgo) (AD 1541–1700) – 
 House of Bourbon-Anjou (Casa de Borbón-Anjou) (AD 1700–1808, AD 1813–1818) – 
 House of Bonaparte (Casa de Bonaparte) (AD 1808–1813) – 
 Tounes dynasty, kingdom of Araucania and Patagonia with the chiefdoms of Mapuche Nation (1860–1862)

Guyana
 House of Bonaparte (AD 1806–1810) – 
 House of Orange-Nassau (AD 1813–1815) – 
 House of Hanover (AD 1814–1901) – 
 House of Saxe-Coburg and Gotha (AD 1901–1917) – 
 House of Windsor (AD 1917–1970) –

Peru
 Hurin dynasty (1197 – c. 1350), ruling dynasty of earlier Kingdom of Cusco
 Hanan dynasty (c. 1350–1533), ruling dynasty of later Kingdom of Cusco, Inca Empire and Neo-Inca State
 House of Habsburg (Casa de Habsburgo) (1534–1700) as Governorate of New Castile and later as Viceroyalty of Peru – 
 House of Bourbon-Anjou (Casa de Borbón-Anjou) (1700–1808, 1813–1824) Until the end of the Viceroyalty of Peru – 
 House of Bonaparte (Casa de Bonaparte) (1808–1812) Viceroyalty of Peru–

Suriname
 House of Stuart (AD 1660–1667) – 
 House of Hanover (AD 1799–1802, AD 1804–1815) – 
 House of Orange-Nassau (AD 1815–1975) –

Venezuela
 Welser family (1528–1546) –

List of dynasties with claimed possessions in Antarctica

Note that modern territorial claims in Antarctica are suspended under the Antarctic Treaty.

 House of Trastámara (AD 1493–1555) – 
 House of Habsburg (AD 1516–1700) – 
 House of Bourbon-Anjou (AD 1700–1808, AD 1813–1826) – 
 House of Bourbon-Vendôme (AD 1772–1792, AD 1814–1815, AD 1815–1830) – 
 House of Bonaparte (AD 1804–1814, AD 1852–1870, AD 1815) – 
 House of Orléans (AD 1830–1848) – 
 House of Hanover (AD 1841–1901) – 
 House of Saxe-Coburg and Gotha (AD 1901–1917) – 
  (AD 1917–present) – 
 Imperial House of Japan (AD 1912–1952) – 
  (AD 1929–present) –

See also
 Heads of former ruling families
 List of current monarchies
 List of empires
 List of former monarchies
 List of monarchies
 List of noble houses
 List of political families
 Lists of dynasties

Notes

References 

list
Dynasties
Dynasties